= List of 13th-century religious leaders =

This is a list of the top-level leaders for religious groups with at least 50,000 adherents, and that led anytime from January 1, 1201, to December 31, 1300. It should likewise only name leaders listed on other articles and lists.

== Buddhism ==
- Karma Pakshi, Karmapa of the Karma Kagyu (1204–1283)
- Kunga Gyeltsen, Sakya Master of Tibet (1216–1251)

== Christianity ==
=== Catholicism ===
- Roman Catholic Church (complete list) –

- Innocent III, Pope (1198–1216)
- Honorius III, Pope (1216–1227)
- Gregory IX, Pope (1227–1241)
- Celestine IV, Pope (1241)
- Innocent IV, Pope (1243–1254)
- Alexander IV, Pope (1254–1261)
- Urban IV, Pope (1261–1264)
- Clement IV, Pope (1265–1268)
- Gregory X, Pope (1271–1276)
- Innocent V, Pope (1276)
- Adrian V, Pope (1276)
- John XXI, Pope (1276–1277)
- Nicholas III, Pope (1277–1280)
- Martin IV, Pope (1281–1285)
- Honorius IV, Pope (1285–1287)
- Nicholas IV, Pope (1288–1292)
- Celestine V, Pope (1294)
- Boniface VIII, Pope (1294–1303)

=== Eastern Orthodoxy ===
- Church of Constantinople – (complete list), the first among equals in Eastern Orthodoxy

- John X Kamateros, Ecumenical Patriarch of Constantinople (1198–1206)
- Michael IV Autoreianos, Ecumenical Patriarch of Constantinople (1207–1213)
- Theodore II Eirenikos, Ecumenical Patriarch of Constantinople (1213–1215)
- Maximos II, Ecumenical Patriarch of Constantinople (1215)
- Manuel I Charitopoulos, Ecumenical Patriarch of Constantinople (1216–1222)
- Germanus II, Ecumenical Patriarch of Constantinople (1223–1240)
- Methodius II, Ecumenical Patriarch of Constantinople (1240)
- Manuel II, Ecumenical Patriarch of Constantinople (1244–1255)
- Arsenius Autoreianus, Ecumenical Patriarch of Constantinople (1255–1259, 1261–1267)
- Nicephorus II, Ecumenical Patriarch of Constantinople (1260–1261)
- Germanus III, Ecumenical Patriarch of Constantinople (1267)
- Joseph I Galesiotes, Ecumenical Patriarch of Constantinople (1267–1275)
- John XI Bekkos, Ecumenical Patriarch of Constantinople (1275–1282)
- Gregory II Cyprius, Ecumenical Patriarch of Constantinople (1283–1289)
- Athanasius I, Ecumenical Patriarch of Constantinople (1289–1293, 1303–1310)
- John XII, Ecumenical Patriarch of Constantinople (1294–1303)

- Church of Alexandria –

- Nicholas I, Greek Patriarch of Alexandria (1210–1243)

- Church of Antioch –

- Dorotheus I, Orthodox Patriarch of Antioch (1219–1245)

- Church of Jerusalem –

- Euthemius II, Orthodox Patriarch of Jerusalem (?-?)

- Georgian Orthodox Church –

- Epiphane, Catholicos-Patriarch of All Georgia (1210–1220)
- Ekvtime II, Catholicos-Patriarch of All Georgia (1220–1222)

=== Oriental Orthodoxy ===
- Coptic Orthodox Church, (complete list) –

- Cyril III, Pope and Patriarch (1235–1243)
- Athanasius III, Pope and Patriarch (1250–1261)
- John VII, Pope and Patriarch (1262–1268, 1271–1293)
- Gabriel III, Pope and Patriarch (1268–1271)
- Theodosius II, Pope and Patriarch (1293–1300)

- Syriac Orthodox Church, (complete list) –

- John XI, Syriac Orthodox Patriarch of Antioch (1208–1220)
- Ignatius III David, Syriac Orthodox Patriarch of Antioch (1222-1252)

=== Nestorianism ===
- Church of the East, (complete list) –

- Mar Yab-Alaha II Bar Qaiyuma, Patriarch (1190–1222)

== Islam ==
=== Sunni ===
- Abbasid Caliphate (complete list) –

Baghdad
- al-Nasir, Caliph (1180–1225)
- az-Zahir, Caliph (1225–1226)
- al-Mustansir, Caliph (1226–1242)
- al-Musta'sim, Caliph (1242–1258)
Cairo
- al-Mustansir, Caliph (1261–1262)
- al-Hakim I, Caliph (1262–1302)

- Almohad Caliphate, Morocco (complete list) –

- Muhammad al-Nasir, Caliph (1199–1213)
- Yusuf II, Caliph (1213–1224)
- Abd al-Wahid I, Caliph (1224)
- Abdallah al-Adil, Caliph (1224–1227)
- Yahya al-Mu'tasim, Caliph (1227–1229)
- Idris al-Ma'mun, Caliph (1229–1232)
- Abd al-Wahid II, Caliph (1232–1242)
- Said al-Muʿtadid, Caliph (1242–1248)

=== Shia ===
- Twelver Islam

- Imams (complete list) –

- Muhammad al-Mahdi, Imam (874–present) Shia belief holds that he was hidden by Allah in 874.

==== Isma'ili ====
- Hafizi Isma'ilism (complete list) –

- Dawud al-Hamid li'llah, Imam (1171–1207)
- Sulayman Badr al-Din, Imam (1207–1248)
- Extinction of the Hafizi line

- Nizari Isma'ilism (complete list) –

- Nur al-Din Muhammad II, Imam (1166–1210)
- Jalaluddin Hasan, Imam (1210–1221)
- Ala al-Din Muhammad III, Imam (1221–1255)
- Rukn al-Din Khurshah, Imam (1255–1257)
- Shams al-Din Muhammad, Imam (1257–1310)

- Tayyibi Isma'ilism (complete list) –

- Ali ibn Hatim, Da'i al-Mutlaq (1199–1209)
- Ali ibn Muhammad ibn al-Walid, Da'i al-Mutlaq (1209–1216)
- Ali ibn Hanzala, Da'i al-Mutlaq (1216–1229)
- Ahmad ibn Mubarak, Da'i al-Mutlaq (1229–1230)
- Al-Husayn ibn Ali, Da'i al-Mutlaq (1230–1268)
- Ali ibn al-Husayn, Da'i al-Mutlaq (1268–1284)
- Ali ibn al-Husayn ibn Ali ibn Hanzala, Da'i al-Mutlaq (1284–1287)
- Ibrahim ibn al-Husayn, Da'i al-Mutlaq (1287–1328)

==== Zaydi ====
- Zaydi imams of Yemen (complete list) –

- al-Mansur Abdallah, Imam (1187–1217)
- an-Nasir Muhammad bin Abdallah, Imam (1217–1226)
- al-Hadi Yahya, Imam (1217–1239)
- al-Mahdi Ahmad bin al-Husayn, Imam (1248–1258)
- al-Hasan bin Wahhas, Imam (1258–1260)
- Yahya bin Muhammad as-Siraji, Imam (1261–1262)
- al-Mansur al-Hasan, Imam (1262–1271)
- al-Mahdi Ibrahim, Imam (1272–1276)
- al-Mutawakkil al-Mutahhar bin Yahya, Imam (1276–1298)

== See also ==
- Religious leaders by year
- List of state leaders in the 13th century
- Lists of colonial governors by century
