= Patriarch Manuel of Constantinople =

Patriarch Manuel of Constantinople may refer to:

- Manuel I of Constantinople, Ecumenical Patriarch in 1216–1222
- Manuel II of Constantinople, Ecumenical Patriarch in 1244–1255
