= Patriarch Theodore II =

Patriarch Theodore II may refer to:

- Patriarch Theodore II of Alexandria (Coadjutor), Greek Patriarch of Alexandria between the 7th and 8th centuries
- Theodore II of Constantinople, Ecumenical Patriarch in 1214–1216
- Patriarch Theodore II of Alexandria, Greek Patriarch of Alexandria since 2004
