= Bardanes =

Bardanes (Greek: Βαρδάνης) may refer to:

- Philippikos Bardanes (died 713), Byzantine emperor in 711–713
- Bardanes Tourkos (died 803), Byzantine general and rebel
- George Bardanes (died c. 1240), Byzantine bishop and theologian
- Bardanes (moth), a genus of moths
