= Mikhaēl IV =

Mikhaēl IV may refer to:

- Michael IV the Paphlagonian (1010–1041)
- Patriarch Michael IV of Constantinople (died in 1214)
