= Patriarch Theodore of Constantinople =

Patriarch Theodore of Constantinople may refer to:

- Theodore I of Constantinople, Ecumenical Patriarch in 677–679
- Theodore II of Constantinople, Ecumenical Patriarch in 1214–1216
