= Theodoros II =

Theodoros II may refer to:

- Patriarch Theodore II of Alexandria (Coadjutor), Greek Patriarch of Alexandria between the 7th and 8th centuries
- Theodore II of Constantinople, Ecumenical Patriarch in 1214–1216
- Theodore II Laskaris, Emperor of Nicaea in 1254–1258
- Theodore II Palaiologos, Despot in Morea in 1407–1443
- Tewodros II, Emperor of Ethiopia from 1855 to 1868
- Patriarch Theodore II of Alexandria, Greek Patriarch of Alexandria since 2004
- Pope Tawadros II of Alexandria, ruled since 2012
