= Ali ibn Muhammad ibn al-Walid =

Yemeni Ismaili leader from 1209 to 1215

Ali ibn al-Walid al-Abshami al-Qurashi

Dāʿī al-Muṭlaq
- In office 31 May 1209 – 21 December 1215
- Preceded by: Ali ibn Hatim
- Succeeded by: Ali ibn Hanzala

Personal details
- Born: Ali ibn Muhammad ibn Ja'far ibn Ibrahim ibn Abi Salama ibn al-Walid al-Abshami al-Qurashi c. 1128
- Died: 21 December 1215 (aged 86–87)
- Burial: Sana'a, Yemen
- Religion: Tayyibi Isma'ilism

Ali ibn Muhammad ibn Ja'far ibn Ibrahim ibn Abi Salama ibn al-Walid al-Abshami al-Qurashi (Arabic: علي بن محمد بن الوليد القرشي; c. 1128 – 21 December 1215) was the 5th Tayyibi Isma'ili Da'i al-Mutlaq in Yemen from 1209 to his death in 1215. Descended from a noble lineage of the Quraysh, he was a noted scholar and Tayyibi theologian, and an author of several influential works on Tayyibi doctrine. Before becoming himself Da'i al-Mutlaq, he served as senior deputy to the third and fourth holders of the office. His rise to the office inaugurated a period of two and a half centuries where it would be almost monopolized by members of his own family.

== Life ==
=== Origin and early career ===
Ali had a distinguished lineage, being a scion of the Banu al-Walid al-Anf family of the Quraysh tribe, ultimately tracing his descent to Abd Manaf ibn Qusayy. He was a descendant of the 7th-century Umayyad prince al-Walid ibn Utba ibn Abi Sufyan, while his great-grandfather Ibrahim ibn Abi Salama, known as Ibrahim al-Anf ("Ibrahim the Proud"), had been a follower of Ali al-Sulayhi, the Isma'ili founder of the Sulayhid dynasty that came to rule over most of Yemen, and was sent by him as an envoy to the Fatimid caliph al-Mustansir.

In his youth he had been a student of his uncle, Ali ibn al-Husayn, who was then ma'dhun (senior deputy) to the second Da'i al-Mutlaq, Ibrahim ibn al-Husayn. After his uncle's death, he studied under the ma'dhun Muhammad ibn Tahir al-Harithi, and upon his death in 1188 succeeded him as ma'dhun for the third Da'i al-Mutlaq, Hatim ibn Ibrahim.

He was stationed in Sana'a, where he took over the missionary efforts of Muhammad ibn Tahir, but frequently visited the Tayyibi headquarters at Haraz, and Hatim entrusted to Ali the education of his son, Ali ibn Hatim. It was on Ali's suggestion that Hatim selected his son as his designated successor. When Hatim died in 1199, his son Ali succeeded him, until his death in 1209. During the reign of Ali ibn Hatim, the Tayyibis were expelled from Haraz and found refuge in Sana'a.

=== Rule as Da'i al-Mutlaq ===
Ali ibn Hatim's death on 31 May 1209 ended the Hamadi line without heir, and so Ali succeeded him. Ali ruled as Da'i al-Mutlaq until his death, at Sana'a, on 21 December 1215 at the age of 90 years. The position of Da'i al-Mutlaq (lit. 'absolute/unrestricted missionary') signified their position as the de facto leaders of the Tayyibi community in their capacity as vicegerents of the hidden imam.

Although his immediate successor, Ali ibn Hanzala, was from the Banu Hamdan, in 1230 Ali's son al-Husayn became the eighth Da'i al-Mutlaq, and with a single interruption, the office would remain in the hands of the Banu al-Walid family continuously until 1539. Like most of his predecessors and successors, Ali enjoyed good relations with the Hamdanid dynasty ruling Dhu Marmar, as well as the Ayyubid rulers of Sana'a.

His grave is in Al-Aghmur, a sub-district located in Manakhah District, Sana'a Governorate, Yemen. His grave was not known for 600 years, until it was discovered in March 2019. The official announcement was made on 25 March 2019 by Mufaddal Saifuddin, the Da'i al-Mutlaq of the Dawoodi Bohra.

== Writings ==
Extremely well-educated, he was held in high regard by both contemporaries and later Tayyibi scholars: Hatim ibn Ibrahim reportedly stated that in Ali ibn Muhammad ibn al-Walid were to be found all the qualifications required of a da'i by the 10th-century Isma'ili missionary Ahmad ibn Ibrahim al-Nisaburi. He was a "prolific author", writing a series of important works on Tayyibi doctrine (haqa'iq). Due to the high regard in which they were held by the Tayyibis, most have survived to the present day. Eight have been published in modern times, while the manuscripts of another eight have not yet been published.

The works are:

- Kitāb al-dhakhīra fī l-ḥaqīqa, in 33 chapters, dealing with tawḥīd, cosmology and eschatology, the hierarchy of the daʿwa, the imams and prophets, and a discussion on rewards and punishments for the faithful and their opponents. A modern edition was published by Muhammad Hasan al-A'zami, Beirut 1971.
- Risālat jalāʾ al-ʿuqūl wa-zubdat al-maḥṣūl, also dealing with tawḥīd, cosmological and eschatological issues; edited by Adil al-Awwa in Muntakhabāt Ismāʿīliyya, Damascus 1958, pp. 80–153.
- Risālat al-īḍāḥ wa-l-tabyīn, a short treatise on Tayyibi doctrines on the Creation, Isma'ili hierarchy, eschatology, and on the last Tayyibi imam, at-Tayyib Abu'l-Qasim. It was edited by Rudolf Strothmann and published in his Gnosis-Texte der Ismailiten. Arabische Handschrift Ambrosiana H 75, Göttingen 1943, pp. 138–158.
- Risālat tuḥfat al-murtād wa-ghuṣṣat al-aḍdād, a refutation of the rival Hafizi Isma'ili claims on the imamate, edited by Rudolf Strothmann in Gnosis-Texte der Ismailiten. Arabische Handschrift Ambrosiana H 75, Göttingen 1943, pp. 159–170.
- Risāla [fī maʿnā] al-ism al-aʿẓam, edited by Rudolf Strothmann and published in his Gnosis-Texte der Ismailiten. Arabische Handschrift Ambrosiana H 75, Göttingen 1943, pp. 171–177. The authorship of this treatise was unknown to Strothmann, and was identified as Ali ibn Muhammad by Ismail Poonawala.
- Tāj al-ʿaqāʾid wa-maʿdin al-fawāʾid, edited by Arif Tamir, Beirut, 1st edition 1967 and 2nd edition 1982. A summarized translation was published by Wladimir Ivanow, A Creed of the Fatimids, Bombay, Qayyima Press, 1936.
- Dāmigh al-bāṭil wa-ḥatf al-munāḍil, a two-volume refutation of al-Ghazali's anti-Isma'ili work Kitab al-Mustazhiri, edited by Mustafa Ghalib, Beirut 1982.
- Al-Risāla al-mufīda fī sharḥ mulghaz al-qaṣīda, a commentary on Avicenna's Qaṣīdat al-nafs ("qasidas on the soul"), edited by al-Habib al-Faqi, in Ḥawliyyāt al-Jāmiʿa al-Tūnusiyya, Vol. 17 (1979), pp. 117–182.
- Dīwān Sayyidnā ʿAlī ibn Muḥammad al-Walīd, a collection (diwan) of over 100 poems, including eulogies of his teachers, as well as dealing with doctrinal matters and contemporary historical events. Excerpts have been published by Rudolf Strothmann in "Kleinere Ismailitische Schriften", Islamic Research Association Miscellany, Vol. 1 (1948), pp. 145–146 & 153–163, and in Rabab Hamiduddin's PhD thesis The Qasidah of the Tayyibi Da'wah and the Diwan of Syedna Ali B. Muhammad Al-Walid at the School of Oriental and African Studies (University of London), 2001.
- Ḍiyạ̄ʾ al-albāb, unpublished manuscript.
- Lubb al-maʿārif, unpublished manuscript.
- Lubāb al-fawāʾid, unpublished manuscript.
- Risālat mulḥiqat al-adhhān, unpublished manuscript.
- Mukhtaṣar al-uṣūl, a refutation of the doctrines of the Sunnis, Mu'tazilis, Zaydis, and the philosophers "who deny God all attributes", still unpublished.
- Risālat al-bayān wa-mudḥiḍat al-buhtān, a refutation of Muhammad ibn Ahmad al-Ahwari, a rival of Hatim ibn Ibrahim for the position of Dā'ī al-Mutlaq. Unpublished manuscript.
- Majālis al-nuṣḥ wa-l-bayān, unpublished manuscript.

== Sources ==
- Daftary, Farhad (2004). Ismaili Literature: A Bibliography of Sources and Studies. London and New York: I.B. Tauris. ISBN 978-0-8577-1386-5.
- Daftary, Farhad (2007). The Ismāʿı̄lı̄s: Their History and Doctrines (Second ed.). Cambridge: Cambridge University Press. ISBN 978-0-521-61636-2.
- Poonawala, Ismail K. (2009). "ʿAlī b. al-Walīd". In Fleet, Kate; Krämer, Gudrun; Matringe, Denis; Nawas, John; Rowson, Everett (eds.). Encyclopaedia of Islam (3rd ed.). Brill Online. doi:10.1163/1573-3912_ei3_COM_22932. ISSN 1873-9830.

Shia Islam titles
Ali ibn Muhammad ibn al-Walid Banu al-Walid al-Anf Born: 1128 Died: 21 December 1215
| Preceded by Ali ibn Hatim | Da'i al-Mutlaq of Tayyibi Isma'ilism; 31 May 1209 – 21 December 1215 | Succeeded by Ali ibn Hanzala |
