= Al-Khattab ibn al-Hasan ibn Abi'l-Hifaz =

Al-Khattab ibn al-Hasan ibn Abi'l-Hifaz was a warrior, poet and theologian, who became Dhu'ayb ibn Musa's principal aide, and an important asset to the Sulayhid dynasty and Tayyibi Isma'ilism cause, until his murder by his nephews in a dispute over control of al-Hajur in 1138. Al-Khattab was succeeded as chief assistant (maʾdhūn) by Ibrahim ibn al-Husayn al-Hamidi.

== Life ==
al-Khattab was milk brother to Arwa al-Sulayhi and chief of the tribe of Hajur from Qodam in Hamdaan. During the time of Arwa al-Sulayhi, he faced challenges from his brother Sulaiman. Al-Khattab finally went to battle against him and in one of the encounters, Sulaiman was killed.

al-Khattab took Sulaiman's sons under his care. However, instigated by Sulaiman's supporters, the sons killed al-Khattab in the year 1138.

He was Dhu'ayb ibn Musa's principal aide and a warrior, poet and theologian.

== Books ==
He authored theological works likeMuneerat ul Basaair and Ghayat ul Mawaleed. He has also written a collection of poems.

== See also ==
- Dhu'ayb ibn Musa

== Bibliography ==
- Daftary, Farhad (2007). The Ismāʿı̄lı̄s: Their History and Doctrines (Second ed.). Cambridge: Cambridge University Press. ISBN 978-0-521-61636-2.
- Sayyid, Ayman Fuʾād; Walker, Paul E.; Pomerantz, Maurice A. (2002). The Fatimids and their Successors in Yaman: The History of an Islamic Community. London and New York: I.B. Tauris. ISBN 978-0-8577-1258-5.
