= David A. King (historian) =

British historian and author

Prof David A. King (born 1941 in the United Kingdom) is a British historian and author.

He was educated at University of Oxford, University of Cambridge, Middle East Centre for Arab Studies and Yale.

He was the Professor of Near Eastern Languages and Literatures and History of Science at New York University and the director of the Smithsonian Institution project on medieval Islamic astronomy and Director of the Institute for the History of Science in Johann Wolfgang Goethe University.

== Biography ==
He completed his PhD in 1972 at Yale University. He has previously served as a professor and associate professor in the department of Near Eastern Languages and Literatures of New York University. He is currently a Professor of History of Science and Director of the Institute for the History of Science, Johann Wolfgang Goethe University, Frankfurt am Main.

== Personal ==
His father Henry C. King opened the London Planetarium and wrote The History of the Telescope, the first such study.

King has been married since 1969 to Patricia King and the couple have two sons, one granddaughter and a grandson.

In 2013 King was awarded the Koyré Medal of the Académie internationale d'histoire des sciences for his life's work.

== Bibliography ==
His significant works include:

- In Synchrony with the Heavens, Studies in Astronomical Timekeeping and Instrumentation in Medieval Islamic Civilization
- Astronomy In The Service Of Islam
- Islamic Mathematical Astronomy
- World Maps For Finding The Direction And Distance To Mecca: Innovation And Tradition In Islamic Science
- A Survey Of The Scientific Manuscripts In The Egyptian National Library
- From Deferent to Equant: A Volume of Studies on the History of Science of the Ancient & Medieval Near East
- The Ciphers of the Monks: A Forgotten Number Notation Of The Middle Ages
