= Maximus of Constantinople =

Maximus of Constantinople may refer to:

- Archbishop Maximus I of Constantinople, Archbishop of Constantinople in 380
- Patriarch Maximus II of Constantinople (died 1216), Ecumenical Patriarch of Constantinople in 1216
- Patriarch Maximus III of Constantinople, Ecumenical Patriarch of Constantinople in 1476–1481
- Patriarch Maximus IV of Constantinople, Ecumenical Patriarch of Constantinople in 1491–1497
- Patriarch Maximus V of Constantinople (1897–1972), Ecumenical Patriarch of Constantinople in 1946–1948
- Maximus the Confessor (c. 580–662), Byzantine official, monk and theologian
