= Methodius of Constantinople =

Methodius of Constantinople may refer to:

- Methodius I of Constantinople, Ecumenical Patriarch in 843–847
- Methodius II of Constantinople, Ecumenical Patriarch in 1240
- Methodius III of Constantinople, Ecumenical Patriarch in 1668–1671
