= Demetrios Chomatenos =

Byzantine archbishop and judge

Demetrios Chomatenos or Chomatianos (Greek: Δημήτριος Χωματηνός/Χωματιανός, 13th century), Eastern Orthodox Archbishop of Ohrid from 1216 to 1236, was a Byzantine priest and judge.

His comprehensive legal education allowed him to exert substantial influence as judge, arbiter, confessor and advisor to the Byzantine imperial house. This makes him a characteristic representative of a time when judicial power was devolving from the weakened secular authorities to the Church, and also one of the last legal practitioners in full command of Justinian's laws as recovered by the Macedonian legal renaissance.

According to the eminent Byzantinist Donald Nicol, Chomatenos' court at Ohrid was a rare centre of stability and law in an uncertain and tumultuous era; "From Kerkyra in the west to Drama in the east, from Dyrrachion in the north to Ioannina and Arta in the south, plaintiffs and defendants brought their problems to the humane and learned Archbishop". Some 150 of Chomatenos' case files have survived, allowing legal historians to construct a reasonably complete picture of the legal and institutional framework of the late Byzantine Empire.

He also played an important role in the rivalry of the two main post-Fourth Crusade Byzantine Greek successor states, the Empire of Nicaea and Epirus. Along with John Apokaukos and George Bardanes, Chomatianos championed the Epirote cause of political and ecclesiastical independence from Nicaea (where the exiled Patriarchate of Constantinople had established itself), and in 1225 or 1227, it was he who crowned the Epirote ruler Theodore Komnenos Doukas as Byzantine Emperor in Thessalonica.

An important ecclesiastical and jurisdictional dispute arose soon after his arrival in Ohrid (1216). In that time, the Eastern Orthodox eparchies in Serbia (Raška, Lipljan and Prizren) were still under the jurisdiction of the Archbishop of Ohrid. That changed in 1219, when Patriarch Manuel I of Constantinople (at that time residing in Nicaea), created a new Archbishopric for Serbia by appointing Sava Nemanjić as the first Serbian Archbishop. Demetrios Chomatenos protested and in the spring of 1220 he sent bishop Jovan of Skopje as an envoy to Archbishop Sava, but with no result. Serbia was lost to his jurisdiction, and his later attempts to remedy the situation in 1233 were also unsuccessful.

== Sources ==
- Günter Prinzing (ed.), Demetrii Chomateni Ponemata diaphora (Corpus Fontium Historiae Byzantinae 38). Berlin 2002. ISBN 3-11-015612-1
- Nicol, Donald M. (1976). "Refugees, Mixed Population and Local Patriotism in Epiros and Western Macedonia after the Fourth Crusade". XVe Congrès international d'études byzantines (Athènes, 1976), Rapports et corapports I. Athens. pp. 3–33.
- Simon, Dieter (2001). "Chomatian, Demetrios". In Michael Stolleis (ed.). Juristen: ein biographisches Lexikon; von der Antike bis zum 20. Jahrhundert (in German) (2nd ed.). München: Beck. p. 129. ISBN 3-406-45957-9.
- Popović, Svetlana (2002). "The Serbian Episcopal sees in the thirteenth century (Српска епископска седишта у XIII веку)". Старинар (51: 2001): 171–184.
- Ćirković, Sima (2004). The Serbs. Malden: Blackwell Publishing. ISBN 9781405142915.
