= John Ebdon =

British author and broadcaster

John Ebdon (22 December 1923 – 19 March 2005) was a British author, broadcaster, Graecophile and, for 21 years, director of the London Planetarium. He was educated at Blundell's School. On his death, obituaries appeared in the Times, Independent, Guardian and Telegraph newspapers and on the BBC.

Ebdon presented the BBC's Archive Feature on the Home Service and Radio 4 from 1961 to 1987. He also presented the archive-based Nonsense at Noon on the Home Service, 1965–66. "His facetious patrician tones every third Monday morning, his sense of the absurd, his ear for a word mistakenly taken out of context, his famous cat Perseus, delighted much of middle England as much as it infuriated a small minority."--Glyn Worsnip.

== Books ==
- Teach Your Child About the Stars (1963)
- Ebdon's Odyssey (1979)
- Ebdon's Iliad (1983)
- Ebdon's England (1985)
- Near Myths: A Love Affair with Greece (1989)
- From My Archives: Maiden Aunts and Other Trifles (1990)
