= Ali ibn al-Husayn ibn Ali ibn Hanzala =

Ali ibn al-Husayn ibn Ali ibn Hanzala (Arabic: علي بن الحسين بن علي بن حنظلة, romanized: ʿAlī ibn al-Ḥusayn ibn ʿAlī ibn Ḥanẓala) was the tenth Tayyibi Isma'ili Da'i al-Mutlaq in Yemen, from 1284 to his death in 1287.

He was the son of al-Husayn, the ma'dhun (senior deputy) to his predecessor, the ninth Da'i, also named Ali ibn al-Husayn, and grandson of the sixth Da'i, Ali ibn Hanzala. Ali and his grandfather belonged to the Banu Hamdan and were the only ones to break the monopoly of the Qurayshi Ibn al-Walid family on the office of Da'i al-Mutlaq during the 13th century. He was succeeded by another Ibn al-Walid, Ibrahim ibn al-Husayn.

== Sources ==
- Daftary, Farhad (2007). The Ismāʿı̄lı̄s: Their History and Doctrines (Second ed.). Cambridge: Cambridge University Press. ISBN 978-0-521-61636-2.

Shia Islam titles
Ali ibn al-Husayn ibn Ali ibn Hanzala Banu Hamdan Died: 1287
| Preceded by Ali ibn al-Husayn | Da'i al-Mutlaq of Tayyibi Isma'ilism; 1284–1287 CE | Succeeded by Ibrahim ibn al-Husayn |

|}
