= Abu'l-Fawaris Ahmad ibn Ya'qub =

11th-century Isma'ili scholar

Abu'l-Fawaris Ahmad ibn Ya'qub was an early 11th-century Isma'ili scholar and missionary (da'i) active in Syria, which at the time was largely under the rule of the Fatimid Caliphate. Abu'l-Fawaris was active in the reign of the Fatimid imam-caliph al-Hakim (r. 996–1021), and a contemporary of the fellow Isma'ili scholars, Ahmad ibn Ibrahim al-Naysaburi and Hamid al-Din al-Kirmani. All three elaborated Isma'ili ideas about the Imamate, apparently independently, since they do not cite each other's works.

Abu'l-Fawaris' only known work is the Risāla fi’l-imāma ('Epistle on the Imamate'), likely composed before 1017, is divided in sixteen chapters, deliberately chosen to correspond with al-Hakim being the sixteenth Isma'ili imam. In it, Abu'l-Fawaris argues about the existence of the imamate as a necessity, as the Quran, the sharia (the body of Islamic law) and the sunnah (the traditions ascribed to Muhammad) are not sufficient. The treatise has been published in a critical edition with English translation by Sami N. Makarem as The Political Doctrine of the Ismāʿīlīs: The Imamate. Caravan Books, Delmar, New York, 1977.

== Sources ==
- Lalani, Arzina R. (2010). Degrees of Excellence: A Fatimid Treatise on Leadership. A new Arabic edition and English translation of Aḥmad b. Ibrāhīm al-Naysābūrī's Kitāb ithbāt al-imāma. London and New York: I. B. Tauris. ISBN 978-1-84511-145-8.
