= George Bardanes =

George Bardanes (Greek: Γεώργιος Βαρδάνης, died. ca. 1240) was a Byzantine churchman and theologian from Athens. A pupil of Michael Choniates, he later became bishop of Corfu and played a major role in the rivalry between the Epirote Church and the Ecumenical Patriarchate, exiled in the Empire of Nicaea.

== Life ==
Bardanes was born in Athens some time in the late 12th century. He came under the tutelage of the city's archbishop, Michael Choniates, under whom he received his education.

When Athens was captured by the Crusaders in 1205, Bardanes followed his master to his exile on Keos, serving as his secretary (hypomnematographos and chartophylax). In 1214 he went to the capital of the Latin Empire, Constantinople, to represent Choniates in the discussions between Greek Orthodox prelates and the Papal representative, Cardinal Pelagius of Albano. By 1218 he was serving in the bishopric of Grevena as chartophylax. By this time he had established a friendship and correspondence with another prominent cleric, the Metropolitan of Naupaktos John Apokaukos, and through the latter's intercession, was appointed in 1219 as Metropolitan of Corfu by the ruler of Epirus, Theodore Komnenos Doukas.

From this position Bardanes, along with Apokaukos and the Archbishop of Ohrid Demetrios Chomatenos, became one of the leading proponents of political and ecclesiastical independence of Epirus from the Empire of Nicaea, where the exiled Ecumenical Patriarch of Constantinople resided after the city had fallen to the Crusaders. In 1228, Bardanes authored the letter of the Epirote clergy to Patriarch Germanus II which effected a schism between the two Churches that lasted until 1233, when again it fell to Bardanes to compose the letter that ended it.

In 1235/6, the ruler of Thessalonica Manuel Komnenos Doukas sent Bardanes to Italy, as an envoy to Frederick II Hohenstaufen and Pope Gregory IX, but he fell ill at Otranto and was unable to carry out his mission. He died in ca. 1240.

== Sources ==
- Macrides, R. J. (1991). "Bardanes, George". In Kazhdan, Alexander (ed.). The Oxford Dictionary of Byzantium. Oxford University Press. pp. 254–255. ISBN 978-0-19-504652-6.
