= Ali ibn al-Husayn (Ibn al-Walid) =

Ali ibn al-Husayn ibn Ali ibn Muhammad ibn al-Walid (Arabic: علي بن الحسين بن علي بن محمد بن الوليد, romanized: ʿAlī ibn al-Ḥusayn ibn ʿAlī ibn Muḥammad ibn al-Walīd) was the ninth Tayyibi Isma'ili Da'i al-Mutlaq in Yemen, from 1268 to his death in 1284.

== Life ==
He was the son and chief assistant of the eighth Da'i, al-Husayn ibn Ali, and thus a member of the Banu al-Walid al-Anf family that dominated the office of Da'i al-Mutlaq almost continuously in the 13th to early 16th centuries.

Due to intense fighting between the Zaidi Imam and the Hamdanids, Ali moved from his original seat at Sanaa to the Hamdanid fortress of Arus. He returned to Sanaa only after it was recaptured by the Hamdanids, and died there. He was succeeded by Ali ibn al-Husayn ibn Ali ibn Hanzala, the grandson of the sixth Da'i, Ali ibn Hanzala, and son of Ali's own ma'dhun (senior deputy).

== Sources ==
- Daftary, Farhad (2007). The Ismāʿı̄lı̄s: Their History and Doctrines (Second ed.). Cambridge: Cambridge University Press. ISBN 978-0-521-61636-2.

Shia Islam titles
Ali ibn al-Husayn (Ibn al-Walid) Banu al-Walid al-Anf Died: 1284
Preceded by al-Husayn ibn Ali	Da'i al-Mutlaq of Tayyibi Isma'ilism; 1268–1284 CE	Succeeded by Ali ibn al-Husayn ibn Ali ibn Hanzala
