= Henry C. King =

British astronomer and writer (1915–2005)

- Born: March 9, 1915; London
- Died: July 30, 2005 (aged 90)
- Occupation: Astronomer
- Employer(s): London Planetarium; McLaughlin Planetarium
- Organization: British Astronomical Association
- Children: David A. King

Henry C. King (9 March 1915 – 30 July 2005) was a British astronomer and writer.

He was born in London, but the family later moved to Marlow, Buckinghamshire where Henry attended the Sir William Borlase School. For his thirteenth birthday, his father gave him a copy of The Story of The Heavens by Robert S Ball. Another move took the family to Slough in the late 1930s. Here Henry contacted Lady Constance Lubbock, William Herschel's grand-daughter, and was able to access the Herschel Library.

He obtained a B.Sc. in astronomy and mathematics by correspondence, from the University of London, and subsequently, an MSc and Ph.D on the history and philosophy of science.

During World War II he was Inspector of Aeronautical Instruments for the Ministry of Aircraft Production at Ruislip. In the 1950s he was Senior Lecturer in Ophthalmic Optics at Northampton College of Advanced Technology, (now City, University of London). In 1956, he became the first Scientific Director of the London Planetarium. Ten years later, he became Director of the McLaughlin Planetarium, Toronto. He was President of the British Astronomical Association from 1958-60.

== Family ==
He married Mary Wilson in 1939. They had two children, David and Margaret.

== Publications ==
- The History of the Telescope, 1955
- The Background of Astronomy, 1956
- Exploration of the Universe: From the Astrolabe to the Radio Telescope, 1964
- Dr H C King's Book of Astronomy, Collins, 1966.

With John R. Millburn

- Geared to the Stars: The Evolution of Planetariums, Orreries and Astronomical Clocks, 1978
- Wheelwright of the Heavens: The Life and Work of James Ferguson, FRS, 1988
