= John of Basingstoke =

John of Basingstoke (died 1252), also called John Basing, was an Archdeacon of Leicester in the 13th century. Basingstoke was an advocate of Greek literacy and seems to have been instrumental in introducing the apocryphal Testament of the Twelve Patriarchs to Robert Grosseteste, bishop of Lincoln. What is known of Basingstoke derives primarily from the writings of Grosseteste and another contemporary, Matthew Paris.

== Early life ==
Taking his name from the town of Basingstoke in Hampshire, Basingstoke studied at Oxford University and spent some time in Paris. Thomas Andrew Archer writes that Basingstoke

seems to have been one of the earliest Englishmen who possessed a real knowledge of Greek, and was probably one of the first natives of our islands—if we except the doubtful instance of John Scotus Eriugena - who perfected himself in this language by a sojourn at Athens.

Matthew Paris writes that during his time in Athens, Basingstoke was tutored by a well-read 19-year-old Athenian girl named Constantina (probably the daughter of archbishop of Athens Michael Acominatus). Basingstoke credited Constantina, who was said to "foretell pestilences, thunderstorms, eclipses, and even earthquakes with unerring certainty", for his knowledge of science.

== Career ==
Based on a letter by Grosseteste, Basingstoke had by 1235 returned to England and was already acting as Archdeacon of Leicester. The year of his appointment is unknown. Basingstoke seems to have been good friends with Grosseteste; according to Paris, he brought to the attention of Grosseteste the apocryphal Testament of the Twelve Patriarchs. In 1242, Grosseteste had the work brought from Greece and translated it with help of a clerk of St. Albans, "for the strengthening of the Christian faith and the confusion of the Jews", who were said to have deliberately hidden the book away "on account of the manifest prophecies of Christ contained therein."

Basingstoke himself was an advocate of Greek study and translated or authored several books into Latin: a Greek book of grammar, the Donatus Græcorum; an order of the Gospel events from the Greek, probably the Concordia Evangeliorum, and an original book on the parts of speech in Greek language.

== See also ==
- Cistercian numerals
