= John Apokaukos =

John Apokaukos (Greek: Ἱωάννης Ἀπόκαυκος, c. 1155 – 1233) was a Byzantine churchman and theologian. Having studied at Constantinople, he became bishop of Naupaktos and played a major role in the rivalry between the Epirote Church and the Ecumenical Patriarchate, exiled in the Empire of Nicaea.

== Life ==
John Apokaukos was born in ca. 1155. He studied in the Byzantine capital, Constantinople, where he was a fellow student with Manuel Sarantenos, later Patriarch of Constantinople. Appointed a deacon, he served under his uncle, Constantine Manasses, metropolitan bishop of Naupaktos in Greece.

By 1186, he had returned to Constantinople, where he served as a notary in the patriarchate, a post in which he is again attested in 1193. In 1199 or 1200 he was appointed as metropolitan of Naupaktos, a post he continued to hold until 1232, when he retired to a monastery at Kozyle near Arta, where he died the following year. During his tenure, he initially clashed with the local ruler Constantine Komnenos Doukas, the younger brother of the ruler of the Despotate of Epirus, Theodore Komnenos Doukas. Apokaukos protested Constantine's authoritarian rule and extortionate tax demands from the populace. The clash led to the forcible deposition and exile of Apokaukos in 1220, and was resolved only in May 1221 after a synod including representatives from most of the senior sees in Greece and the Epirote domains. Indeed, the relations between Constantine and Apokaukos became cordial thereafter, and the bishop even composed an encomium in his honour. During the same period Apokaukos also emerged, along with Demetrios Chomatenos and George Bardanes, as one of the leading supporters of Epirote political and ecclesiastical independence from the Empire of Nicaea, where the exiled Patriarch of Constantinople resided after the city had fallen to the Crusaders. This conflict even led to a schism between the Epirote Church and the Patriarchate.

== Writings ==
A considerable body of Apokaukos' correspondence and documents survive. According to Ruth Macrides, "[his] letters and decisions, like those of Chomatenos, are of central importance for the legal and social history of the period. His writings, which show him to be less knowledgeable in the law and less exacting in its application than his colleague, are remarkable for their clear and humorous portrayals of daily life and popular culture".

== Sources ==
- Macrides, R. J. (1991). "Apokaukos, John". In Kazhdan, Alexander (ed.). The Oxford Dictionary of Byzantium. Oxford and New York: Oxford University Press. p. 135. ISBN 0-19-504652-8.
- Varzos, Konstantinos (1984). Η Γενεαλογία των Κομνηνών, Τόμος Β' [The Genealogy of the Komnenoi, Volume II] (PDF) (in Greek). Thessaloniki: Byzantine Research Centre. Archived from the original (PDF) on 2016-03-03.
