= Michael Choniates =

Byzantine writer and cleric (died 1220)

Saint Michael Choniates, Metropolitan of Athens
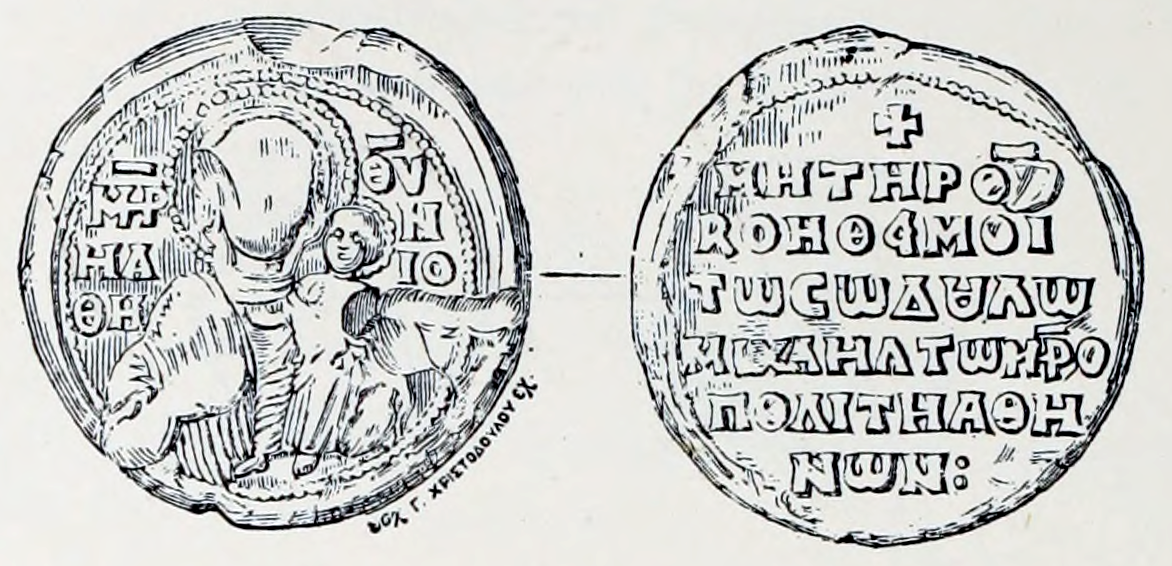
- Lead seal of Michael Choniates as Metropolitan of Athens

Metropolitan
- Born: 1138, Colossae, Asia Minor
- Died: 1222, Monastery of Saint John the Forerunner, Vodonitsa, Thermopylae
- Venerated in: Eastern Orthodoxy
- Feast: 4 July
- Attributes: Bishops vestments
- Patronage: City of Athens

Saint Michael Choniates (or Acominatus; Greek: Μιχαὴλ Χωνιάτης or Ἀκομινάτος; c. 1140 – 1220) was a Byzantine Greek writer and cleric, born at Chonae (the ancient Colossae). At an early age he studied at Constantinople and was the pupil of Eustathius of Thessalonica. In 1182 he was appointed archbishop of Athens, a position which he retained until 1204. In 1204, he defended the Acropolis of Athens from attack by Leo Sgouros, holding out until the arrival of the Crusaders in 1205, to whom he surrendered the city. After the establishment of Latin control, he retired to the island of Ceos. Around 1217 he moved again to the monastery of Vodonitsa near Thermopylae, where he died on 4 July 1222.

Though he is known to classical scholars as the last possessor of complete versions of Callimachus's Hecale and Aitia, he was a versatile writer, and composed homilies, speeches and poems, which, with his correspondence, throw considerable light upon the condition of Attica and Athens at the time. His memorial to Alexios III Angelos on the abuses of Byzantine administration, the poetical lament over the degeneracy of Athens and the monodies on his brother Nicetas and Eustathius, archbishop of Thessalonica, deserve special mention.

It is believed that his daughter Constantina tutored, in Greek and science, John of Basingstoke, Archdeacon of Leicester, known for his fluency in and advocacy of the Greek language. Michael's pupil George Bardanes, who had accompanied him during his exile on Ceos, became a distinguished bishop in subsequent years.

== Notes ==
Eastern Orthodox Church titles
Preceded by George IV	Metropolitan bishop of Athens; 1182–1220 (in exile after 1205)	Vacant Title next held by Meletius I
