= Ahmad ibn Ibrahim al-Naysaburi =

Persian Ismaili scholar, 10th&11th century

Philosophical work
- Era: Fatimid
- Region: Islamic philosophy
- School: Isma'ili
- Main interests: Islamic cosmology, Islamic eschatology, daʿwa, history

Aḥmad ibn Ibrāhı̄m al-Nisaburi or al-Naysaburi (Arabic: أحمد بن إبراهيم النيسابوري; fl. late 10th century/early 11th century) was an Isma'ili scholar from Nishapur, who entered the service of the Fatimid caliphs al-Aziz Billah and al-Hakim bi-Amr Allah in Cairo. His life is relatively obscure, and is known chiefly from references in his works. Among them three stand out as highly important for Fatimid and Isma'ili history: the Istitār al-imām, a historical work that offers unique information on the early history of the Isma'ili movement and the rise of the Fatimid Caliphate, the Risāla al-mūjaza, which contains an exposition on the qualities and duties of the ideal Isma'ili missionary, and the Ithbāt al-imāma, an influential analysis of Isma'ili conceptions of the imamate, combining rationalist philosophical argument with Islamic theology.

== Life ==
Very little is known about Ahmad ibn Ibrahim al-Naysaburi's life, apart from what can be gleaned from his works. As his nisbah reveals, he came from Nishapur, which at the time was a major centre of Isma'ili missionary activity (daʿwa) in Khurasan. Some of the chief Isma'ili theologians of the period, men like Muhammad al-Nasafi and Abu Yaqub al-Sijistani, and later Hamid al-Din al-Kirmani, were active thered. The Isma'ili daʿwa was largely tolerated by the local Samanid dynasty, and Nishapur at the time was experiencing an intellectual renaissance: the great philosopher Avicenna was a son of an Isma'ili convert, and the philosophical traditions of the time, emphasizing rationalism, are evident in al-Naysaburi's own works.

Like his contemporary, Hamid al-Din al-Kirmani, and the later al-Mu'ayyad fi'l-Din al-Shirazi, al-Naysaburi left his native city and settled in Cairo, the capital of the Isma'ili Fatimid Caliphate, during the reign of Caliph al-Aziz Billah (r. 975–996). He remained there during the subsequent reign of al-Hakim bi-Amr Allah (r. 996–1021), rising to what, according to the historian Paul E. Walker, appears to have been a high-ranking position in the Isma'ili daʿwa. It was during al-Hakim's reign that al-Naysaburi composed his works, with topics ranging from history to theology and literature.

== Works ==
Al-Naysaburi's three main works are the Istitār al-imām, Risāla al-mūjaza, and Ithbāt al-imāma, the second of which has not survived directly, but through inclusion in a later work.

=== Istitār al-imām ===
His work Istitār al-imām wa tafarruq al-duʿāt fi’l-jazāʾir li-ṭalabih ("[Book on the] Concealment of the Imam and the Dispersal of Dāʿīs in Search of Him to Different ‘Islands’"), usually shortened to Istitār al-imām, is a significant historical source on the early history of the Isma'ili movement, the early schism that resulted in the flight of Abdullah al-Mahdi Billah, from the Isma'ili headquarters at Salamiyya, and his journey to North Africa, where he established the Fatimid Caliphate in 909. It also contains the first public version of the Fatimid dynasty's official genealogy, possibly published, as the historian Michael Brett suggests, as a reaction to the anti-Fatimid Baghdad Manifesto issued by the Abbasid caliph al-Qahir in 1011.

The work has been edited and published by Wladimir Ivanow in Bulletin of the Faculty of Arts (University of Egypt, Vol. 4, Part 2, 1936), pp. 93–107, and an English translation has been provided by the same author in his Ismaili Tradition concerning the Rise of the Fatimids (London, Oxford University Press, 1942), pp. 157–183. The Arabic text is also published in Suhayl Zakkar's Akhbār al-Qarāmiṭa (2nd edition, Damascus, 1982), pp. 111–132.

=== Risāla al-mūjaza ===
His work al-Risāla al-mūjaza al-kāfiya fı̄ ādāb al-duʿāt ("Brief but Sufficient Account of the Rules of Guidance for the Dāʿīs") contains the only Isma'ili treatise on the qualifications and attributes required for an Isma'ili missionary (dāʿī), and their duties and responsibilities while on mission, combining theological instruction with advice on practical matters. It is an example of adab ("appropriate behaviour, etiquette") literature. Written sometime between 1013 and 1015, it emphasizes the strict obedience owed by the dāʿī to the Caliph-Imam, and considers all other authorities illegitimate; as Michael Brett writes, his strategy aimed to "win recruits against the time when the lords of the land would be either converted or overthrown".

It is quoted in full, apart from a lost introduction, by the 12th-century Yemeni Tayyibi leader Hatim ibn Ibrahim, at the end of his own treatise Tuḥfat al-qulūb, and has since been transmitted among the Tayyibi community, especially the Dawoodi Bohras, until the present day.

A facsimile edition was published in Verena Klemm, Die Mission des fatimidischen Agenten al-Mu’ayyad fi'ddin in Siraz (Frankfurt, Peter Lang, 1989), pp. 205–277, and a translated critical edition by Verena Klemm and Paul E. Walker as A Code of Conduct. A Treatise on the Etiquette of the Fatimid Ismaili Mission (London, 2011).

=== Ithbāt al-imāma ===
His main theological and philosophical work is the Ithbāt al-imāma ("Demonstration/Proof of the Imamate"), where he applies rationalist philosophy and the Platonic principle of "degrees of excellence" to underpin his theological and cosmological concepts. It was written in an atmosphere of deep crisis in the Isma'ili daʿwa, created by Caliph al-Hakim's erratic changes in both doctrine and governance, and is an attempt to reaffirm, in the words of Brett, "the necessity of belief in the Imam as the source of knowledge and the authority for the law". Along with the contemporary works of Abu'l-Fawaris Ahmad ibn Ya'qub (Risāla fi’l-imāma) and al-Kirmani (al-Maṣābiḥ fī ithbāt al-imāma), and the earlier Tathbīt al-imāma written by the third Fatimid caliph, al-Mansur Billah, al-Nusaybi's work provides "an extremely important representation of the Fatimid vision of the imamate".

It was published by M. Ghalib, Beirut, 1984, and in a critical edition with an English translation by Arzina R. Lalani, in Degrees of Excellence: A Fatimid Treatise on Leadership in Islam. An Arabic Edition and English translation of Ahmad al-Naysaburi’s Kitab Ithbat al-Imama (London, I. B. Tauris in association with the Institute of Ismaili Studies, 2006).

=== Other works ===
Other works of al-Naysaburi are the Kitāb al-tawḥīd ("The Book of Unity"), a theological treatise, and the Risālā al-zāhira fī maʿrifat al-dār al-ākhīra ("The Resplendent Treatise on the Recognition of the Abode of the Hereafter"), which deals with eschatology, but its attribution to al-Naysaburi by Ivanow has been questioned by the contemporary historian Ismail Poonawala, who ascribes it to Ahmad ibn Ibrahim al-Ya'buri al-Hamdani.

== Sources ==
- Brett, Michael (2017). The Fatimid Empire. The Edinburgh History of the Islamic Empires. Edinburgh: Edinburgh University Press. ISBN 978-0-7486-4076-8.
- Daftary, Farhad (2004). Ismaili Literature: A Bibliography of Sources and Studies. London and New York: I.B. Tauris. ISBN 978-0-8577-1386-5.
- Daftary, Farhad (2007). The Ismāʿı̄lı̄s: Their History and Doctrines (Second ed.). Cambridge: Cambridge University Press. ISBN 978-0-521-61636-2.
- Klemm, Verena; Walker, Paul E. (2011). A Code of Conduct: A Treatise on the Etiquette of the Fatimid Ismaili Mission. A critical edition of the Arabic text and English translation of Aḥmad b. Ibrāhīm al-Naysābūrī's al-Risāla al-mūjaza al-kāfiya fī ādāb al-duʿāt. London and New York: I. B. Tauris. ISBN 978-1-78076-126-8.
- Lalani, Arzina R. (2010). Degrees of Excellence: A Fatimid Treatise on Leadership. A new Arabic edition and English translation of Aḥmad b. Ibrāhīm al-Naysābūrī's Kitāb ithbāt al-imāma. London and New York: I. B. Tauris. ISBN 978-1-84511-145-8.
- Lalani, Arzina R. (2015). "AL-NAYSABURI, Ahmad ibn Ibrahim". In Leaman, Oliver (ed.). The Biographical Encyclopedia of Islamic Philosophy. Bloomsbury Academic. pp. 369–370. ISBN 978-1-4725-6944-8.
