= Cistercian numerals =

Numeral system developed by Cistercian monks

Numbers written with Cistercian numerals. From left to right: 1 in units place, 2 in tens place (20), 3 in hundreds place (300), 4 in thousands place (4,000), then compound numbers 5,555, 6,789, 9,394.

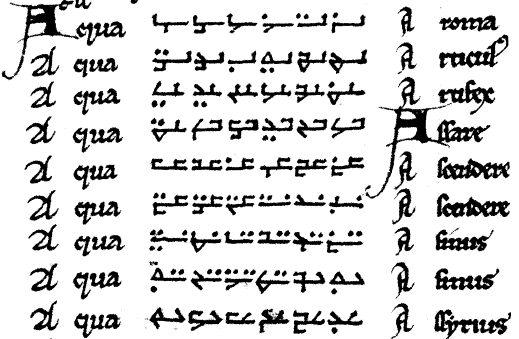
The entry for the word 'aqua' in an early-thirteenth-century concordance from Brussels. Each character is a page/column number. These early Cistercian forms, with 3 and 4 swapped for 7 and 8, plus single and double dots for 5 and 6 and a triangular 9, are found in only one other surviving manuscript. The numbers are, 21, 41, 81, 85, 106, 115, 146, 148, 150, 169, 194, 198, 267, 268, 272, 281, 284, 295, 296, 317, 343, 368, 378, 387, 403, 404, 405, 420, 434, 435, 436, 446, 476, 506, 508, 552, 566, 591, 601, 604, 628, 635, 659, 678, 686, 697, 724, 759, 779, 783, 803, 818, 834, 858.

The medieval Cistercian numerals, or "ciphers" in nineteenth-century parlance, were developed by the Cistercian monastic order in the early thirteenth century at about the time that Arabic numerals were introduced to northwestern Europe. They are more compact than Arabic or Roman numerals, with a single glyph able to indicate any integer from 1 to 9,999.

Digits are based on a horizontal or vertical stave, with the position of the digit on the stave indicating its place value (units, tens, hundreds or thousands). These digits are compounded on a single stave to indicate more complex numbers. The Cistercians eventually abandoned the system in favor of the Arabic numerals, but marginal use outside the order continued until the early twentieth century.

== History ==
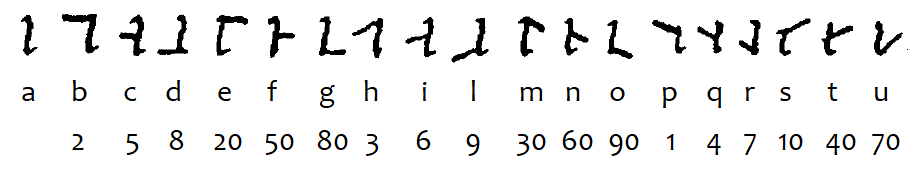
The digits and idea of forming them into ligatures were apparently based on a two-place (1–99) numeral system introduced into the Cistercian Order by John of Basingstoke, archdeacon of Leicester, who it seems based them on a twelfth-century English shorthand (ars notaria). (Note: A copy of the ciphers in a treatise on penmanship (c. 1300 CE) commonly attributed to John of Tilbury, with the corresponding Basingstoke numerical values. Basingstoke's biographer claimed that he learned his system from his teacher in Athens. However, there is no known parallel among Greek numbering systems. It seems more likely that Basingstoke picked up the idea of alphabetic numerical notation in Greece and applied it to an English ars notaria, such as the one at right, commonly attributed to John of Tilbury.) In its earliest attestations, in the monasteries of the County of Hainaut, the Cistercian system was not used for numbers greater than 99, but it was soon expanded to four places, enabling numbers up to 9,999.

The two dozen or so surviving Cistercian manuscripts that use the system date from the thirteenth to the fifteenth century, and cover an area from England to Italy, Normandy to Sweden. The numbers were not used for arithmetic, fractions or accounting, but indicated years, foliation (numbering pages), divisions of texts, the numbering of notes and other lists, indexes and concordances, arguments in Easter tables, and the lines of a staff in musical notation.

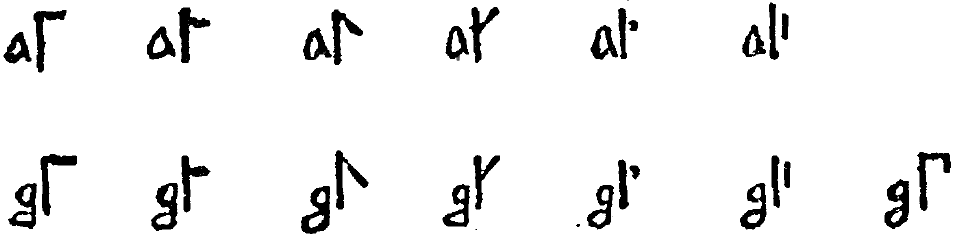
Samples of mixed alphabetic-Cistercian notation used for foliation in a late thirteenth-century manuscript. Shown are a1 to a6 and g1 to g7.

Although mostly confined to the Cistercian order, there was some usage outside it. A late-fifteenth-century Norman treatise on arithmetic used both Cistercian and Indo-Arabic numerals. In one known case, Cistercian numerals were inscribed on a physical object, indicating the calendrical, angular and other numbers on the fourteenth-century astrolabe of Berselius, which was made in French Picardy. After the Cistercians had abandoned the system, marginal use continued outside the order. In 1533, Heinrich Cornelius Agrippa von Nettesheim included a description of these ciphers in his Three Books of Occult Philosophy. The numerals were used by wine-gaugers in the Bruges area at least until the early eighteenth century. In the late eighteenth century, Chevaliers de la Rose-Croix of Paris briefly adopted the numerals for mystical use, and in the early twentieth century Nazis considered using the numerals as Aryan symbolism.

The modern definitive expert on Cistercian numerals is the mathematician and historian of astronomy, David A. King.

== Form ==
A horizontal stave was most common while the numerals were in use among the Cistercians. A vertical stave was attested only in Northern France in the fourteenth and fifteenth centuries. However, eighteenth- and twentieth-century revivals of the system in France and Germany used a vertical stave. There is also some historical variation as to which corner of the number represented which place value. The place-values shown here were the most common among the Cistercians and the only ones used later.

Using graphic substitutes with a vertical stave, (Note: Cistercian numerals are not supported by Unicode, and are here substituted with Chao tone letters. Depending on the fonts you have installed, it may be that only the ones and twos will display properly. (The Under-ConScript Unicode Registry has tentatively assigned the units to PUA values U+EBA1 to U+EBAF.)) the first five digits are ꜒ 1, ꜓ 2, ꜒꜓ 3, ꜓꜒ 4, ꜍ 5. Reversing them forms the tens, ˥ 10, ˦ 20, ˦˥ 30, ˥˦ 40, ꜈ 50. Inverting them forms the hundreds, ꜖ 100, ꜕ 200, ꜖꜕ 300, ꜕꜖ 400, ꜑ 500, and doing both forms the thousands, ˩ 1,000, ˨ 2,000, ˨˩ 3,000, ˩˨ 4,000, ꜌ 5,000. Thus ⌶ (a digit 1 at each corner) is the number 1,111. (The exact forms varied by date and by monastery. For example, the digits shown here for 3 and 4 were in some manuscripts swapped with those for 7 and 8, and the 5s may be written with a lower dot (꜎ etc.), with a short vertical stroke in place of the dot, or even with a triangle joining to the stave, which in other manuscripts indicated a 9.)

The vertical forms of the digits (1–9, 10–90, 100–900 and 1,000–9,000), with an innovative form of 5 as engraved on an early-sixteenth-century Norman astrolabe.

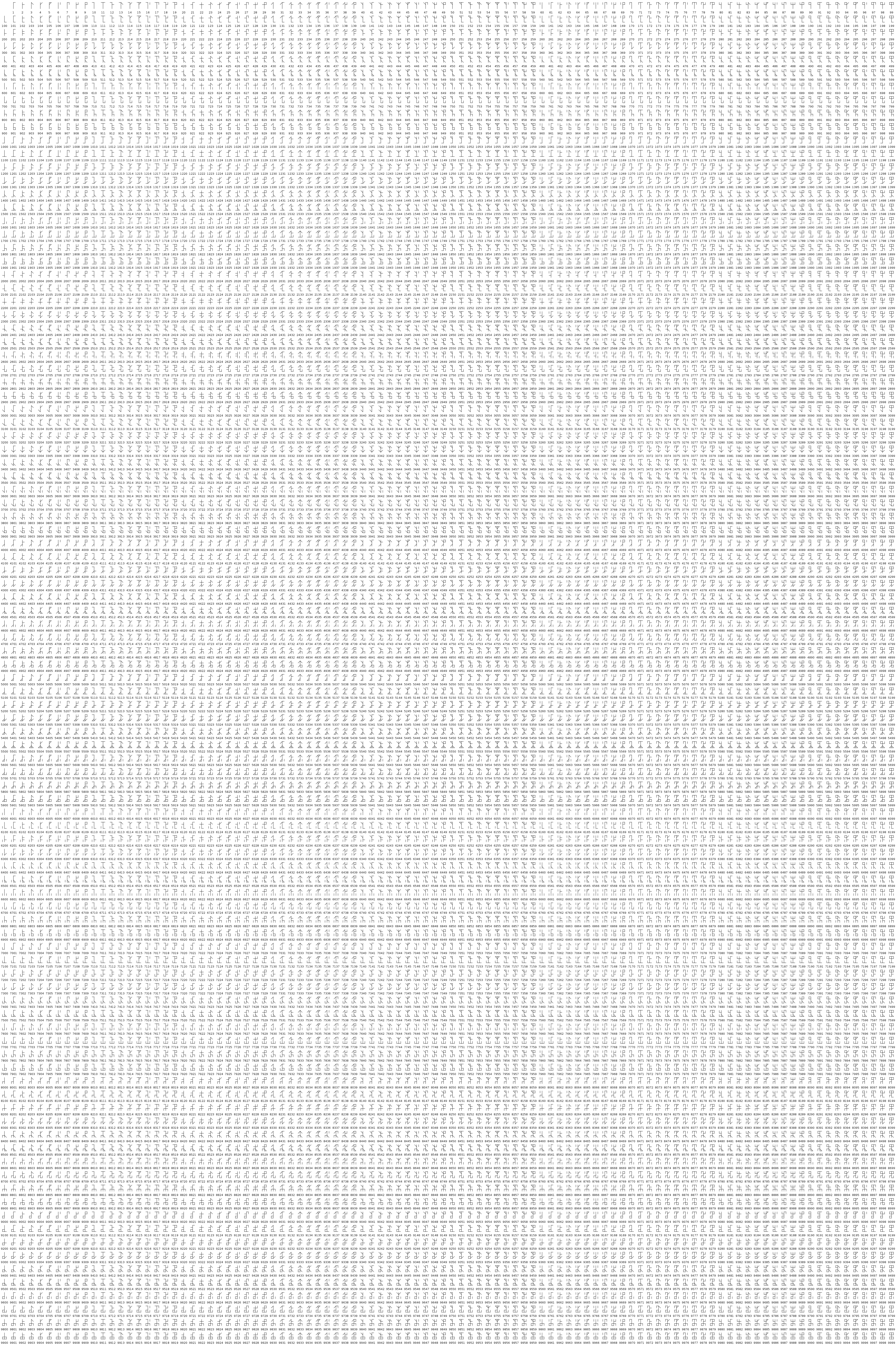
All Cistercian numerals from 1 to 9999 (open to enlarge).

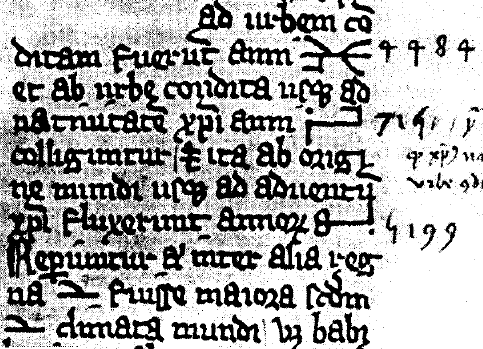
A fourteenth-century Norman manuscript that used only Cistercian numerals. These were horizontal to fit the flow of the text. Note the round form of the digit 9. Numbers were later retranscribed with Hindu-Arabic digits in the margin notes: here we see 4,484, 715 and 5,199.

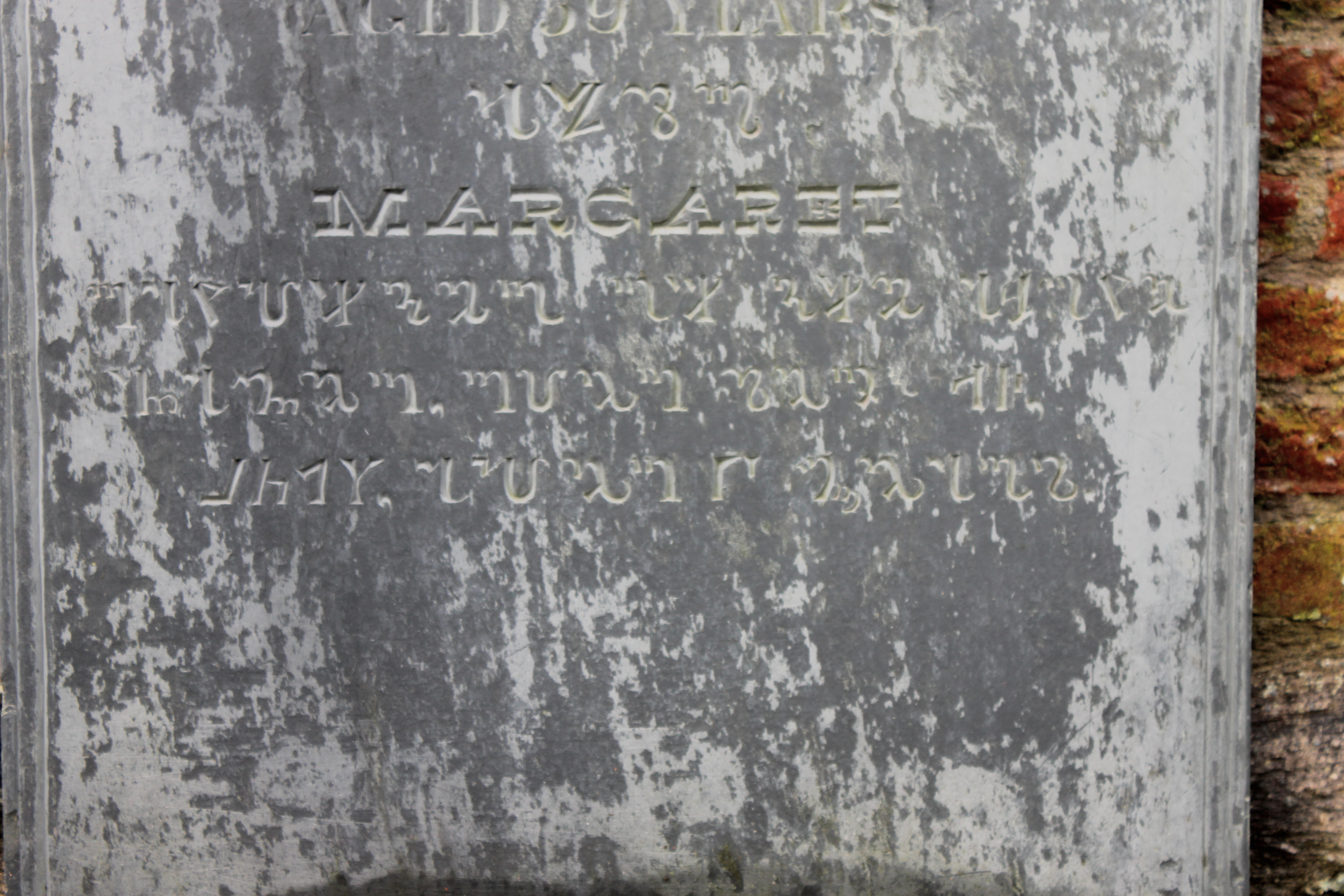
A 19th-century gravestone in Llanfyllin, Wales, inscribed in the Theban script and an adaptation of Cistercian numerals; the year 1834 at bottom left is written with the four characters for 1000, 800, 30, and 4, rather than the single character for 1834.

Horizontal numbers were the same, but rotated 90 degrees counter-clockwise. (That is, ⌙ for 1, ⌐ for 10, ⏗ for 100—thus ⏘ for 101—and ¬ for 1,000, as seen above.)

Omitting a digit from a corner meant a value of zero for that power of ten, but there was no digit zero - an empty stave was not defined.

== Higher numbers ==
When the system spread outside the order in the fifteenth and sixteenth centuries, numbers into the millions were enabled by compounding with the digit for "thousand". For example, a late-fifteenth century Norman treatise on arithmetic indicated 10,000 as a ligature of ⌋ "1,000" wrapped under and around ⌉ "10" (and similarly for higher numbers), and Noviomagus in 1539 wrote "million" by subscripting ¬ "1,000" under another ¬ "1,000". A late-thirteenth-century Cistercian doodle had differentiated horizontal digits for lower powers of ten from vertical digits for higher powers of ten, but that potentially productive convention is not known to have been exploited at the time; it could have covered numbers into the tens of millions (horizontal 10^{0} to 10^{3}, vertical 10^{4} to 10^{7}). A sixteenth-century mathematician used vertical digits for the traditional values, horizontal digits for millions, and rotated them a further 45° counter-clockwise for billions and another 90° for trillions, but it is not clear how the intermediate powers of ten were to be indicated and this convention was not adopted by others.

== The Ciphers of the Monks ==
The Ciphers of the Monks: A Forgotten Number-notation of the Middle Ages, by David A. King and published in 2001, describes the Cistercian numeral system.

The book received mixed reviews. Historian Ann Moyer lauded King for re-introducing the numerical system to a larger audience, since many had forgotten about it. Mathematician Detlef Spalt claimed that King exaggerated the system's importance and made mistakes in applying the system in the book devoted to it. Moritz Wedell, however, called the book a "lucid description" and a "comprehensive review of the history of research" concerning the monks' ciphers.
