= Ahmad ibn Mubarak =

Ahmad ibn Mubarak (Arabic: أحمد بن مبارك, romanized: Aḥmad ibn Mubārak) was the seventh Tayyibi Isma'ili Da'i al-Mutlaq in Yemen, from 1229 to his death in 1230.

== Life ==
Ahmad was the son of Mubarak, brother of the fifth Da'i al-Mutlaq, Ali. Upon assuming office, he dispatched emissaries to various places in Yemen and India. Sanaa remained his seat of administration and he maintained cordial relations with various rulers in Yemen.

He was succeeded by al-Husayn, the son of Ali ibn Muhammad.

== Sources ==
- Daftary, Farhad (2007). The Ismāʿı̄lı̄s: Their History and Doctrines (Second ed.). Cambridge: Cambridge University Press. ISBN 978-0-521-61636-2.

Shia Islam titles
Ahmad ibn Mubarak Banu al-Walid al-Anf Died: 1230
Preceded by Ali ibn Hanzala	Da'i al-Mutlaq of Tayyibi Isma'ilism; 1229–1230 CE	Succeeded by al-Husayn ibn Ali
