= Hypatos ton philosophon =

11th-14th centuries senior scholars title in Constantinople

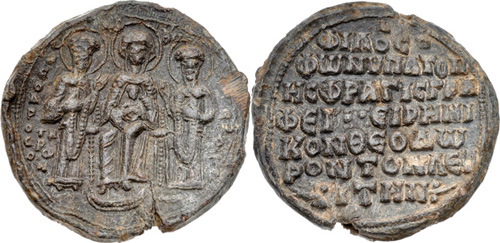
Seal of Theodore Eirenikos (d. 1216) describing him as philosophon hypatoni.

The hypatos tōn philosophon (Greek: ὕπατος τῶν φιλοσόφων, lit. 'chief of the philosophers') was a Byzantine title given to senior scholars in the 11th–14th centuries.

The title first appears in 1047 and was probably introduced then or slightly earlier, for Michael Psellos. In the 11th and 12th centuries, the title recognized the head of the school of philosophy in the imperial capital, Constantinople. While Psellos and his successors, John Italos and Theodore of Smyrna, were themselves distinguished scholars, however, the appointment of Michael of Anchialus (the future Patriarch Michael III of Constantinople) to the post in 1165–1167 was an attempt by Emperor Manuel I Komnenos to clamp down on "pagan" tendencies among the philosophers and reaffirm the primacy and purity of Orthodox doctrine.

The office is still mentioned in the 14th century, ranked in the imperial hierarchy between the logothetes tou dromou and the megas chartoularios. During the 13th and 14th century, the holders of the office were senior teachers under the supervision of the patriarchate.

== Bibliography ==
- Kazhdan, Alexander (1991). "Hypatos ton philosophon". In Kazhdan, Alexander (ed.). The Oxford Dictionary of Byzantium. Oxford and New York: Oxford University Press. p. 964. ISBN 0-19-504652-8.
