= London Planetarium =

Historic tourist attraction in London

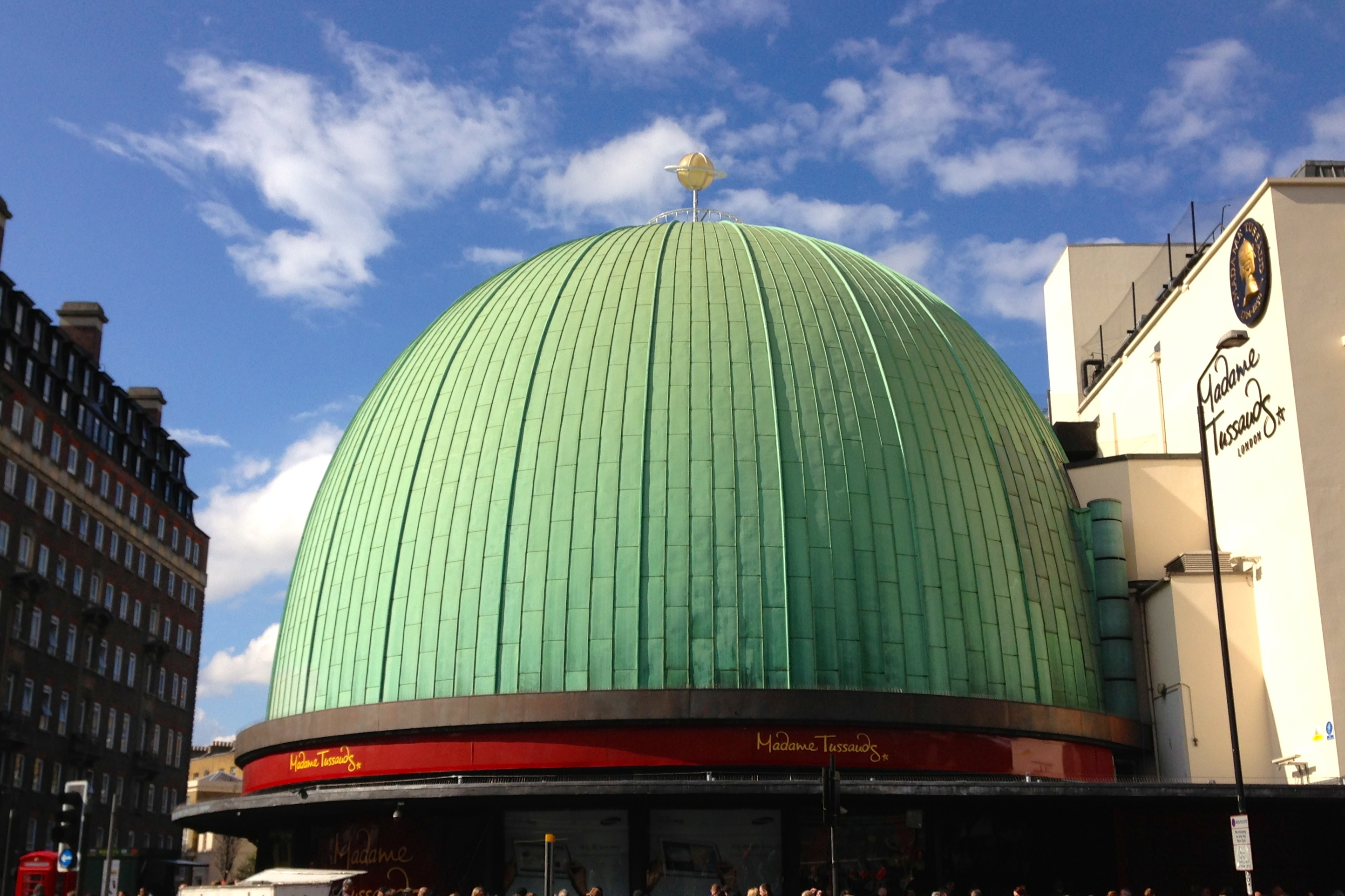
The former planetarium showing Tussaud's branding.

The London Planetarium building is located on Marylebone Road, London. It is adjacent to and owned by Madame Tussauds. It previously housed a planetarium, offering shows related to space and astronomy. In 2006, it was closed as a separate attraction and became part of Madame Tussauds. Since 2010, the building that previously housed the London Planetarium had a Marvel Super Heroes 4D attraction.

== History ==
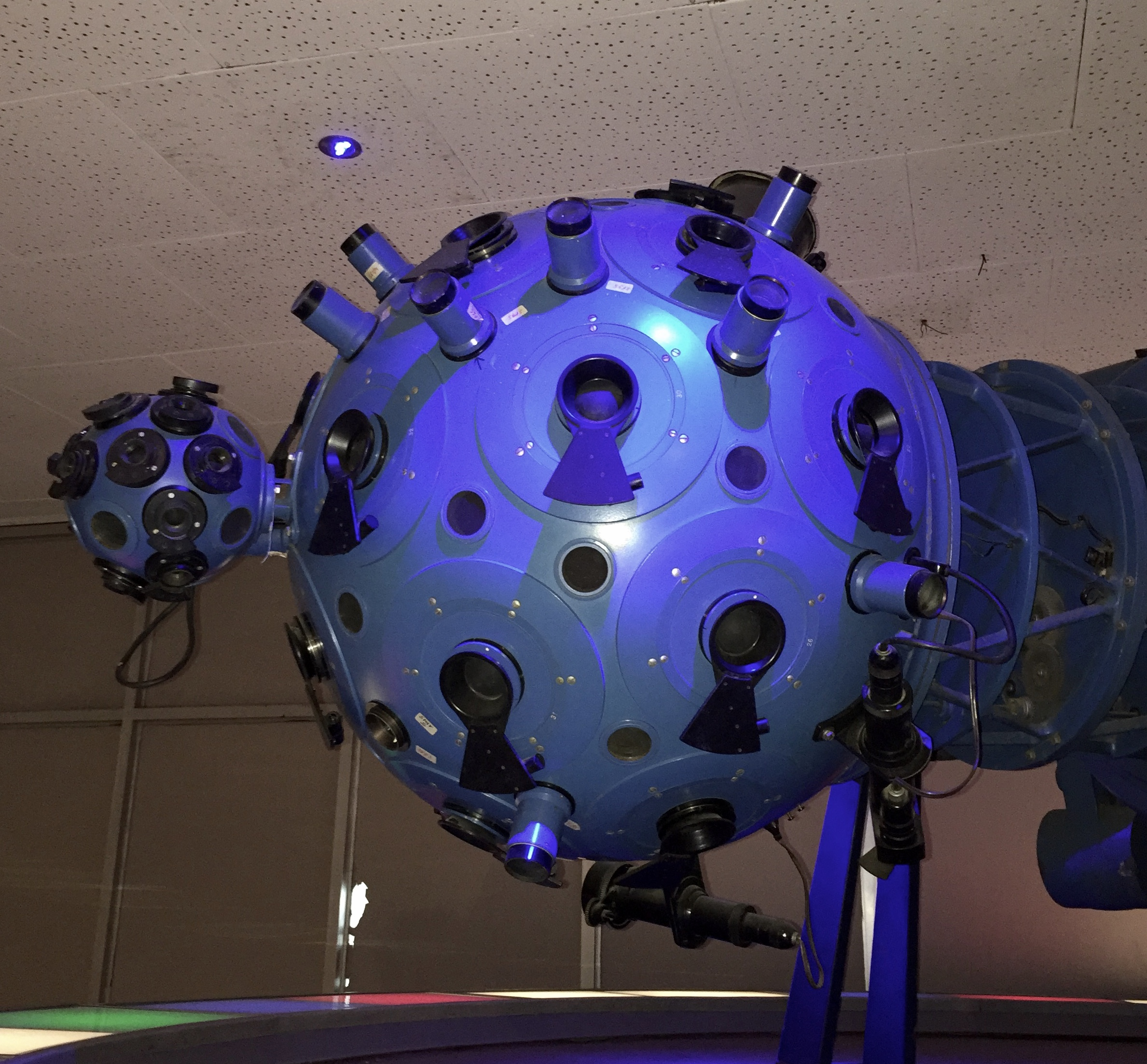
Closeup of a lens-bearing sphere of a Zeiss Mark IV planetarium projector.

The London Planetarium was opened by Prince Philip, Duke of Edinburgh on 19 March 1958, with public presentations commencing on 20 March. It occupied the site of a cinema destroyed in the Second World War, and seated an audience of around 330 people beneath a horizontal dome approximately 18.29 m (160 ft) in diameter. For its first five decades of operation an optomechanical star projector, a Zeiss projector Mark IV, offered the audience a show based on a view of the night sky seen from Earth. Between 1977 and 1990, evening laser performances called 'Laserium' were held.

In 1995, Digistar II was installed as part of a £4.5 million redevelopment, adding monochromatic 3D journeys through virtual outer space and others. The Planetarium was used to teach students from University College London's astronomy department the complexity of the Astronomical coordinate system.

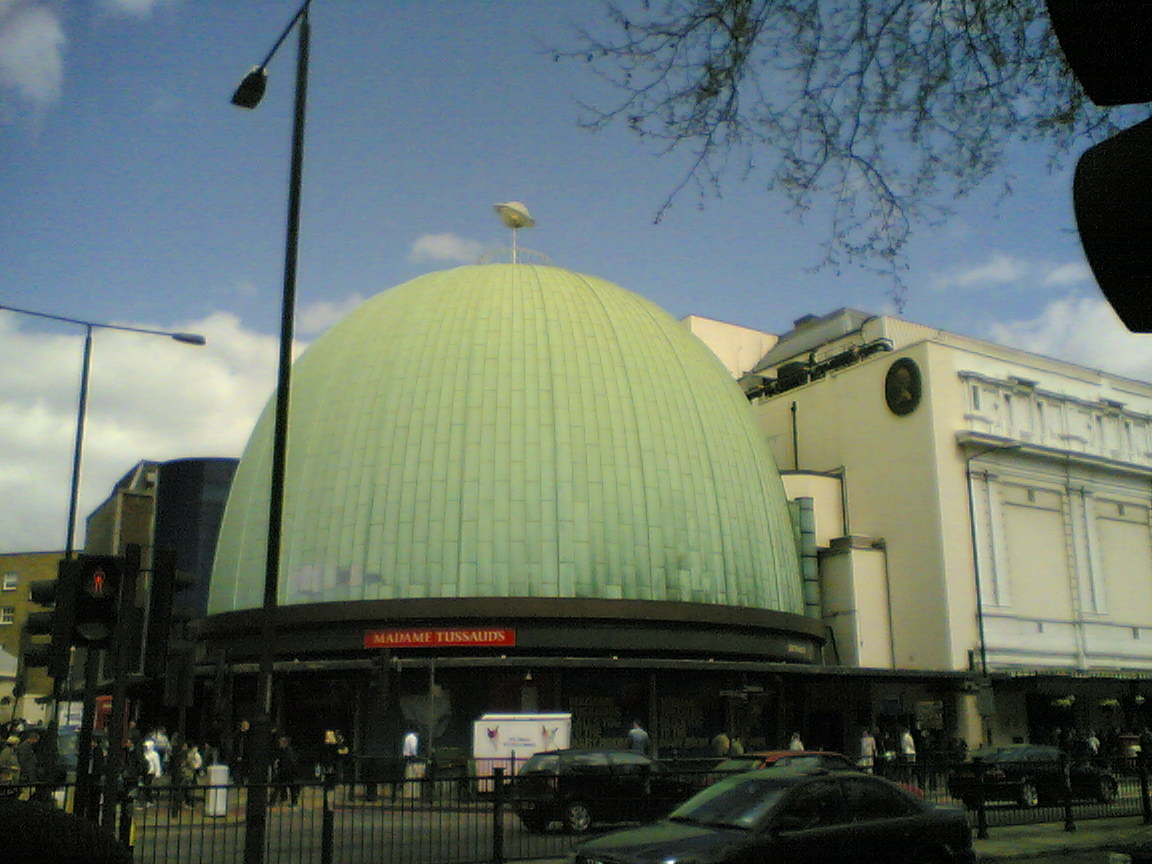
The London Planetarium in 2006.

In 2004, the planetarium was upgraded to a full-colour Digistar III system that allowed for both pre-rendered and real-time shows to transport the audience in an immersive full-dome video environment to outer space.

In January 2006, the London Evening Standard reported that the London Planetarium was being renamed "The Auditorium" and would replace astronomical presentations with entertainment shows. Madame Tussauds subsequently announced that in July 2006, the Auditorium would open with a show by Aardman Animations about celebrities.

== Directors ==
Dr. Henry C. King opened the London Planetarium and served as the first (and only) Scientific Director.

John Ebdon, author, broadcaster, and Grecophile, was director of the London Planetarium .
