= Dhu'ayb ibn Musa =

Religious figure in Dawoodi Bohra Islam

Syedna Dhu'ayb ibn Musa 1st Da'i al-Mutlaq of the Dawoodi, Alavi & Sulaymani Bohras.
- ذؤيب بن موسى
- A page from a historical Dawoodi Bohra treatise displaying Syedna Dhu'ayb's name in Arabic

Da'i al-Mutlaq
- In office 4th May AD 1138 – 29th April AD 1151
- Succeeded by: Ibrahim ibn al-Husayn al-Hamidi
- Title: Syedna; Maulana; Da'i al-Mutlaq; Da'i al-Fatemi; Farras al-Kutub
- Died: 29 April 1151 CE Huth, Yemen
- Resting place: Huth, Yemen
- Parent: Mūsā al-Wādiʿī al-Hamdānī (father)

Religious life
- Religion: Islam
- Sect: Isma'ili; Dawoodi Bohra
- Jurisprudence: Mustaali; Tayyabi

Dhu'ayb ibn Musa al-Wadi'i al-Hamdani (Also Zoeb, Zoaib & Zuayb; Arabic: ذؤيب بن موسى الوادعي الهمداني, romanized: Dhuʾayb ibn Mūsā al-Wādiʿī al-Hamdānī; died 29 April 1151) was the first dāʿī al-muṭlaq, a position of spiritual authority in Tayyibi Isma'ili Islam. He was appointed to the position by Queen Arwa al-Sulayhi.

== Career ==
Dhu'ayb began his career as a member of the pro-Fatimid, Musta'li daʿwa in Yemen, and rose to become an assistant of the local chief missionary (dāʿī), Yahya ibn Lamak. Shortly before his death in 1126, Ibn Lamak, after consulting the Sulayhid queen Arwa al-Sulayhi, chose him as his successor.

In 1130, following the death of the Fatimid imam-caliph al-Amir bi-Ahkam Allah, Musta'li Isma'ilism was split into the Hafizi and Tayyibi branches, with the former acknowledging the succession of al-Amir's cousin al-Hafiz li-Din Allah, and the latter the succession of al-Amir's infant son, al-Tayyib. In Yemen, the hitherto pro-Fatimid queen Arwa sided with the Tayyibis and broke off relations with Cairo, while the regional dynasties of the Hamdanids and the Zurayids recognized al-Hafiz's claims. Until her death in 1138, Arwa effectively headed the new Tayyibi daʿwa, and came to be regarded by the Tayyibis as hujja, the living proof of the hidden (satr) imam al-Tayyib. With the support of Dhu'ayb and other dāʿīs, the queen spent most of her final years in organizing the new sect. Sometime after 1132, she appointed Dhu'ayb as dāʿī al-muṭlaq, thus making him the head of the daʿwa on behalf of the hidden imam. This was not an easy undertaking, as the other Yemeni rulers did not adopt Tayyibi Isma'ilism, and after Arwa's death, the Tayyibis were left without a strong patron. Nevertheless, precisely due to the establishment of an independent hierarchy, separate from both the Fatimids and the Sulayhids, the Tayyibi daʿwa managed to not only survive both regimes, but also spread in the region.

As dāʿī, Dhu'ayb managed to convert al-Khattab ibn al-Hasan ibn Abi'l-Hifaz, the chieftain of the al-Hajur clan of the Banu Hamdan tribe. A skilled warrior and notable poet and theologian, al-Khattab became Dhu'ayb's principal aide, and an important asset to the Sulayhid and Tayyibi cause, until his murder by his nephews in a dispute over control of al-Hajur in 1138. Al-Khattab was succeeded as chief assistant (maʾdhūn) by another Hamdanid, Ibrahim ibn al-Husayn al-Hamidi. When Dhu'ayb died in 1151, Ibrahim became the new dāʿī al-muṭlaq.

== Sources ==
- Daftary, Farhad (2007). The Ismāʿı̄lı̄s: Their History and Doctrines (Second ed.). Cambridge: Cambridge University Press. ISBN 978-0-521-61636-2.

Shia Islam titles
Dhu'ayb ibn Musa Dā'ī al-Mutlaq Died: 29 April 1151 CE, Hooth, Yemen
Preceded by New title	1st Dā'ī al-Mutlaq : 1132-1151 CE	Succeeded by Ibrahim ibn al-Husayn al-Hamidi
