= Michael IV of Constantinople =

Ecumenical Patriarch of Constantinople from 1208 to 1212

- Ecumenical Patriarch of Constantinople
- Church: Church of Constantinople
- In office: 20 March 1208 – 26 August 1212
- Predecessor: John X of Constantinople
- Successor: Theodore II of Constantinople

Personal details
- Born: Michael Autoreianos
- Died: 26 August 1212 Nicaea
- Denomination: Eastern Orthodoxy

Michael IV Autoreianos (Byzantine Greek: Μιχαὴλ Αὐτωρειανός; died 26 August 1212) was the Ecumenical Patriarch of Constantinople from 1208 to his death in 1212.

Michael was a well-educated man and a member of the literary circle around Eustathius of Thessalonica. In the ecclesiastic hierarchy, he had reached the post of megas sakellarios at the time of the sack of Constantinople by the Fourth Crusade in 1204. According to a letter written by John Apokaukos in 1222(?), he was nominated bishop of Amastris, but David Komnenos rejected his nomination as an infringement of his sovereignty. In 1208 he was made patriarch by Theodore I Laskaris, in succession of John X of Constantinople who had died in 1206. Laskaris had established a Byzantine Greek successor state in Asia, the Empire of Nicaea, and had tried to persuade John X to join him, but he had refused because of old age and died shortly after.

Shortly after his appointment, on 20 March 1208, Michael IV performed Theodore I Laskaris' coronation as emperor (Laskaris had already been acclaimed emperor in 1205). He also took the highly unusual move, contrary to both Byzantine tradition and Orthodox doctrine, of promising remission of sins for Laskaris' soldiers who fell in battle. It appears however that this pledge was of short duration. He died at Nicaea on 26 August 1212.

== Bibliography ==
- Kazhdan, Alexander, ed. (1991), Oxford Dictionary of Byzantium, Oxford University Press, ISBN 978-0-19-504652-6.

Eastern Orthodox Church titles
| Preceded by John X | Ecumenical Patriarch of Constantinople; In exile at Nicaea; 1208 – 1212 | Succeeded by Theodore II |
