= Germanus II of Constantinople =

Ecumenical Patriarch of Constantinople from 1223 to 1240

- Ecumenical Patriarch of Constantinople
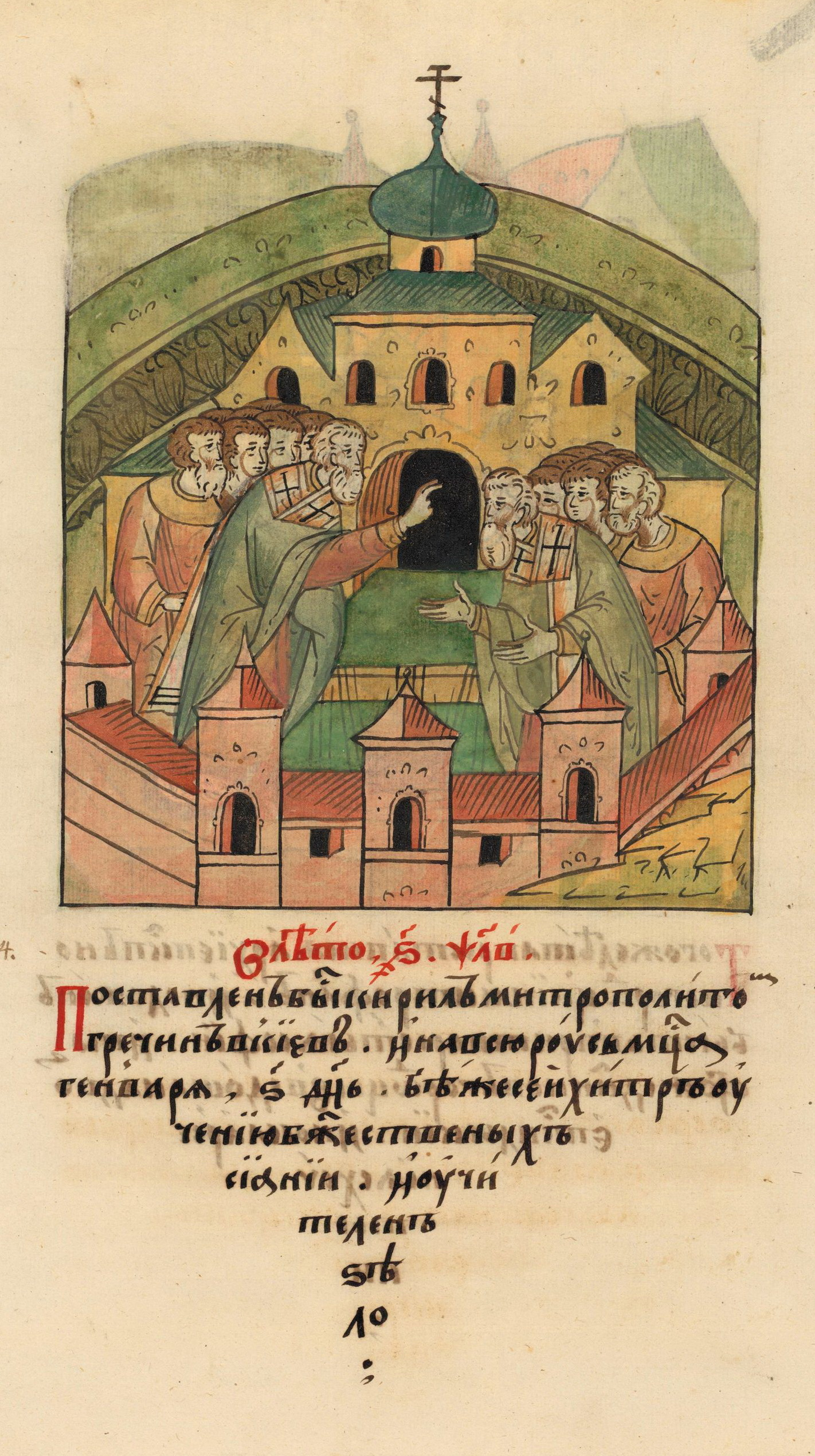
- Miniature from the Illustrated Chronicle of Ivan the Terrible (16th century)
- Church: Church of Constantinople
- In office: 4 January 1223 – June 1240
- Predecessor: Manuel I of Constantinople
- Successor: Methodius II of Constantinople

Personal details
- Born: Anaplous, Thrace
- Died: June 1240
- Denomination: Eastern Orthodoxy

Germanus II Nauplius (Greek: Γερμανός Ναύπλιος; died June 1240) was Ecumenical Patriarch of Constantinople (in exile at Nicaea) from 4 January 1223 until his death in June 1240.

He was born at Anaplous in the second half of the 12th century. At the time of the Fourth Crusade in 1204, he served as a deacon in the Hagia Sophia; following the sack of Constantinople, he retired to a monastery at Achyraous.

In 1223, he was selected by the Nicaean emperor John III Doukas Vatatzes to fill the seat of the Ecumenical Patriarchate, which had relocated in Nymphaion after the fall of Constantinople in 1204. Germanus II assumed the patriarchal throne on 4 January 1223 and quickly proved himself a valuable ally to Vatatzes. Throughout his patriarchate, Germanus II strove to re-establish his authority as the head of the politically splintered Orthodox world, all the while supporting Vatatzes' in his claim to the Byzantine imperial inheritance. Thus Germanus II clashed with the prelates of Epirus for their support of the Epirote rulers, and especially the Archbishop of Ohrid, Demetrios Chomatenos, who had presided over the coronation of Theodore Komnenos Doukas as emperor at Thessalonica, directly challenging Nicaea's position. After the Epirote defeat at Klokotnitsa in 1230 however, the Epirote bishops were gradually won over; in 1232, the schism was healed with the Epirote church recognizing his authority, followed by a tour of the region by Germanus II in 1238.

By contrast, Germanus II was willing to bow to political realities on the issue of the Bulgarian Church. In 1235, he convened a council in Lampsacus on the Hellespont that included Eastern Patriarchs, dignitaries from the Greek and Bulgarian churches, abbots from a number of monasteries including from Mount Athos. This Council recognized the Bulgarian Church as a junior patriarchate. In part this was the result of political necessity, as a condition for the alliance between Vatatzes and the Bulgarian Emperor Ivan Asen II, but it was also seen a necessary move to detach the Bulgarian Church from its post-1204 submission to Rome. Similar motives lay behind his recognition of the autocephalous status of the Serbian Church.

Although a fierce critic of the perceived "errors" of the Catholic Church, and author of numerous anti-Catholic treatises, he was initially willing to a rapprochement with Rome. In 1232, he sent a group of Franciscans, with whose demeanor and desire for reconciliation he had been impressed, as envoys to the Pope. Germanus II proposed the convening of a full ecumenical council, aiming at the reunion of the Churches. In response, a delegation of Franciscans and Dominicans arrived at Nicaea in 1234, but their remit was limited, they had no authority to conduct any negotiations, only to sound out the emperor and the patriarch. The Latin delegation attended a council held in Nymphaion, but it broke up in acrimony between the Greeks and Latins. The papal envoys fled back to Rome, while the Nicaeans went on to attack Constantinople.

== Bibliography ==
- Angold, Michael (1999). "Byzantium in exile". In Abulafia, David (ed.). The New Cambridge Medieval History, Volume 5, c.1198–c.1300. Cambridge: Cambridge University Press. pp. 543–568. ISBN 978-1-13905573-4.
- Kazhdan, Alexander, ed. (1991). The Oxford Dictionary of Byzantium. Oxford and New York: Oxford University Press. ISBN 0-19-504652-8.

Eastern Orthodox Church titles
Preceded by Manuel I	Ecumenical Patriarch of Constantinople; In exile at Nicaea; 1223 – 1240	Succeeded by Methodius II
