= Ibn al-Walid =

Al-Husayn ibn Ali ibn Muhammad ibn Ja'far ibn Ibrahim ibn al-Walid al-Anf al-Qurashi (Arabic: الحسين بن علي بن محمد القرشي) was the eighth Tayyibi Isma'ili Dāʿī al-Muṭlaq in Yemen, from 1230 to his death in 1268.

== Life ==
He was the son of the fifth Dāʿī, Ali ibn Muhammad ibn al-Walid, and thus a member of the Banu al-Walid al-Anf family, that dominated the office of Dāʿī al-Muṭlaq almost continuously in the 13th to early 16th centuries. The position of Dāʿī al-Muṭlaq ("absolute/unrestricted missionary") was the supreme authority of the Tayyibi community in their capacity as vicegerents of the absent Imam, the eponymous at-Tayyib Abu'l-Qasim, who remained in occultation.

Like his father, al-Husayn had close relations with the Rasulid dynasty of Sana'a, and converted several of their members to Tayyibi Isma'ilism, as well as the Banu Hatim branch of the Hamdanid dynasty of Dhu Marmar. Al-Husayn briefly moved the headquarters of the Tayyibi daʿwa to Dhu Marmar, before returning to Sana'a.

He was also the author of a number of treatises on Tayyibi esoteric doctrine (ḥaqāʾiq), notably the al-Mabdaʾ wa'l-maʿād, which deals with Tayyibi conceptions of cosmogony and eschatology.

He was succeeded by his son Ali, who had been his father's chief assistant.

== Works ==
An 18th-century catalogue of Isma'ili literature attributes several works on Tayyibi esoteric theology (ḥaqāʾiq) to him, held by the Bohras in India. Most of them are unpublished, held in 19th- or 20th-century copies by the Institute of Ismaili Studies of London.

His Risālat al-mabdaʾ wa'l-maʿād ("Treatise on the origin and return"), a brief but concise exposition of Tayyibi doctrine on cosmology and eschatology, was edited and published by Henry Corbin in his Trilogie ismaélienne (Tehran and Paris, 1961). He has also written the Risālat Waheedah. A chapter of another work, Risālat al-īḍāḥ wa'l-bayān ("Treatise of elucidation and explanation") which interprets the story of the Fall of Adam as an allegory for the rebellion and fall of a "cosmic intellect". It was edited by Bernard Lewis in "An Ismaili interpretation of the fall of Adam", Bulletin of the School of Oriental and African Studies Vol. 9 (1938), pp. 691–704, and analysed by Daniel De Smet in "L’arbre de la connaissance du bien et du mal. Transformation d’un thème biblique dans l’ismaélisme ṭayyibite", in Studies in Arabic and Islam. Proceedings of the 19th Congress, Union Européenne des Arabisants et Islamisants, Halle 1998 (Leuven, 2002), pp. 513–521.

== Sources ==
- Daftary, Farhad (2007). The Ismāʿı̄lı̄s: Their History and Doctrines (Second ed.). Cambridge: Cambridge University Press. ISBN 978-0-521-61636-2.
- De Smet, Daniel (2018). "Ibn al-Walīd, al-Ḥusayn b. ʿAlī". In Fleet, Kate; Krämer, Gudrun; Matringe, Denis; Nawas, John; Rowson, Everett (eds.). Encyclopaedia of Islam (3rd ed.). Brill Online. doi:10.1163/1573-3912_ei3_COM_32289. ISSN 1873-9830.

Shia Islam titles
Ibn al-Walid Banu al-Walid al-Anf Died: 1268 CE
Preceded by Ahmad ibn Mubarak	Da'i al-Mutlaq of Tayyibi Isma'ilism; 1230–1268 CE	Succeeded by Ali ibn al-Husayn
