= Ali ibn Hatim =

Ali ibn Hatim al-Hamidi (Arabic: علي بن حاتم الحامدي, romanized: ʿAlī ibn Ḥātim al-Ḥāmidī) was the fourth Tayyibi Isma'ili Da'i al-Mutlaq in Yemen, from 1199 to his death in 1209.

== Life ==
Ali was chosen by his father, the Da'i al-Mutlaq Hatim ibn Ibrahim, as his successor on the recommendation of Hatim's ma'dhun (senior deputy to the Da'i al-Mutlaq), Ali ibn Muhammad ibn al-Walid, who had been his tutor. When Hatim died in 1199, Ali succeeded him, still with Ali ibn Muhammad ibn al-Walid as his ma'dhun.

During his tenure he was forced to move the headquarters of the Tayyibi da'wa from the fortress of Haraz to Sanaa, because the Ya'buri family ruling Haraz fell into fratricidal conflict and turned against the Tayyibis. The Hamdanids of Sanaa welcomed him, and their overlords, the Ayyubids, did not oppose his presence in the city.

Ali later moved to Zimarmar but was taken back to San'a' when he fell ill.

== Death ==
Ali died on 31 May 1209, and with him ended the Hamidi line. He was succeeded by Ali ibn Muhammad, who founded the Banu al-Walid al-Anf line of Tayyibi Da'i al-Mutlaqs.

He is buried in Sanaa, but the site of his grave is unknown.

== Sources ==
- Daftary, Farhad (2007). The Ismāʿı̄lı̄s: Their History and Doctrines (Second ed.). Cambridge: Cambridge University Press. ISBN 978-0-521-61636-2.
- Madelung, Wilferd (1971). "al-Ḥāmidī". In Lewis, B.; Ménage, V. L.; Pellat, Ch. & Schacht, J. (eds.). The Encyclopaedia of Islam, Second Edition. Volume III: H–Iram. Leiden: E. J. Brill. p. 134. doi:10.1163/1573-3912_islam_SIM_2675. OCLC 495469525.
- DU'AAT-E-KERAAM (aq) of Yaman, 4th Da'i ul-Mutlaq, Saiyedna 'Ali bin Saiyedna Haatim al-Haamedi (QR), 25 Zul Qa’adah 605 AH (Sana'a) – 30/5/1209 AD url = https://www.alavibohra.org/4th%20dai%20syedna%20ali%20bin%20s%20haatim%20qr.htm

Shia Islam titles
Ali ibn Hatim Hamidi family (Banu Hamdan) Died: 31 May 1209
Preceded by Hatim ibn Ibrahim	Da'i al-Mutlaq of Tayyibi Isma'ilism; 1199 – 1209	Succeeded by Ali ibn Muhammad ibn al-Walid
