= Manuel II of Constantinople =

Ecumenical Patriarch of Constantinople from 1243 to 1254

- Ecumenical Patriarch of Constantinople
- Church: Church of Constantinople
- In office: c. September 1243 – 3 November 1254
- Predecessor: Methodius II of Constantinople
- Successor: Arsenius of Constantinople

Personal details
- Died: 3 November 1254
- Denomination: Eastern Orthodoxy

Manuel II of Constantinople (Greek: Μανουήλ; died 3 November 1254) was the Ecumenical Patriarch of Constantinople from c. 1243 to 1254. Because of the Latin occupation of Constantinople (1204–1261), Manuel II resided at the temporary Byzantine capital in Nicaea. He worked in close collaboration with Emperor John III Doukas Vatatzes, particularly in negotiations concerning possible union with the Latin Church. In 1249, Manuel II was likely involved with the delegation from Pope Innocent IV and led by the Franciscan friar John of Parma, which arrived at the temporary Patriarchal seat in Nymphaeum in 1249 and until 1250, there to debate the Filioque against the Orthodox spokesman Nikephoros Blemmydes. The delegation from the Pope returned to him with a note from the Patriarch which exhorted unity under Christ as the only head of the Church, avoiding the term "Schism" and referring only to the "separation" of the Churches. In 1253, the Emperor and Manuel II sent envoys to Pope Innocent IV to more formally discuss ecclesiastical union, renewing these negotiations. These were conducted in Perugia, and appear to have achieved some entente, with Innocent acknowledging the sincerity of the Orthodox Church's desire for union. Despite continued disagreement about the Filioque clause in the Nicene Creed, negotiations continued, which resulted in an initial offer of formal recognition of the Greek Patriarchate. No further progress was made after 1254, however, as the architects of the entente – Pope Innocent IV, Emperor John III Doukas Vatatzes, and the Patriarch Manuel II – all died within a few months of each other, and the impetus was lost.

In 1247–1248 he wrote to the Armenian Kingdom of Cilicia Hethum I and the Catholicos regarding their relations with the Byzantine Church, and in July 1250 he composed a series of responses to canonical questions. In 1253–1254 he received solemn assurance, under pain of censure, from the regent Michael VIII Palaiologos, that he would not intrigue against the Emperor of Nicaea, Theodore II Laskaris (1254–1258); and early in 1254, he addressed a letter to the emperor instructing him on his duties.

Manuel held, before his patriarchate, the position of protopapas among the ecclesiastics of the Byzantine court, then fixed at Nicaea. Noted as a man of piety and holiness, "though married", Akropolites comments sourly that he was a man "who had no experience of letters, nor was able to unravel the meaning of what he read". The three Sententice Synodales of the patriarch Manuel II given in the Jus Graeco-Romanum undoubtedly belong to this patriarch.

Manuel II's death is distinctly fixed as having occurred two months before that of Emperor John III Doukas Vatatzes, on 30 October 1255. The duration of his patriarchate is fixed by Nikephoros Kallistos Xanthopoulos, at eleven years. George Akropolites and Xanthopoulos both suggest the throne was vacant "for some years" before Manuel was appointed (1240–1243). It is therefore relatively certain Manuel II died in office that year, on 3 November 1254.

== Bibliography ==
- Michael Angold, Church and Society in Byzantium under the Comneni 1081–1261, Cambridge University Press, 1995 ISBN 9780511562341.
- Grumel, V. (ed.); Les Regestes des actes du Patriarcat de Constantinople, 2e éd., Institut français d'études byzantines, Paris, 1971.
- Joan M. Hussey, The Orthodox Church in the Byzantine Empire, Oxford University Press, 1986 ISBN 9780199582761.
- Kazhdan, Alexander (1991), The Oxford Dictionary Of Byzantium, Oxford University Press.
- Ruth Macrides, George Akropolites - The History - Introduction, translation and commentary, Oxford University Press, 2007 ISBN 9780199210671.
- Jacques Paul Migne, Patrologia Graeca, vol. 145–147, Greek text and Latin translation.

Eastern Orthodox Church titles
Preceded by Methodius II	Ecumenical Patriarch of Constantinople; In exile at Nicaea; 1243 – 1254	Succeeded by Arsenius
