= Ali ibn Hanzala =

Ali ibn Hanzala ibn Abi Salim al-Mahfuzi al-Wadi'i al-Hamdani (Arabic: علي بن حنظلة بن أبي سالم المحفوظي الوادعي الهمداني, romanized: ʿAlī ibn Ḥanẓala ibn Abī Sālim al-Maḥfūẓī al-Wādiʿī al-Hamdānī) was the sixth Tayyibi Isma'ili Da'i al-Mutlaq in Yemen, from 1215 to his death in 1229.

== Life ==
A member of the Banu Hamdan tribe, Ali ibn Hanzala had been active within the Tayyibi da'wa already during the tenure of the third Da'i al-Mutlaq, Hatim ibn Ibrahim (1162–1199). Under the fifth Da'i al-Mutlaq, Ali ibn Muhammad ibn al-Walid (1209–1215), he served as his senior deputy (ma'dhun) and succeeded him when the latter died in 1215. The position of Da'i al-Mutlaq (lit. 'absolute/unrestricted missionary') signified their position as the de facto leaders of the Tayyibi community in their capacity as vicegerents of the hidden imam.

Like most of his predecessors and successors, Ali enjoyed good relations with the Hamdanid dynasty ruling Sanaa and their Ayyubid overlords, which allowed him to reside both in Sanaa and in the Hatimid Hamdanid stronghold of Dhu Marmar. He also sent junior missionaries to assist the growing Isma'ili community in western India. At the same time, he confronted the attempts of the rival Hafizi Isma'ili da'wa, and the Zaydi imams, to expand their influence in his territories.

His own ma'dhuns were both relatives of his predecessor, Ali ibn Muhammad: Ahmad ibn Mubarak, Ali's nephew, and Ali's son al-Husayn. Both would succeed him as Da'i al-Mutlaq after his death on 8 February 1229.

== Writings ==
Ali ibn Hanzala was very well educated, with a particular interest in astrology and natural sciences. He wrote two theological works on Tayyibi esoteric doctrine (ḥaqāʾiq):

- the Simṭ al-ḥaqaʾiq ("Banquet of reality"), a work on Tayyibi concepts on tawḥīd, cosmology and eschatology, written as a poem of 663 verses. It has been edited and published in Damascus in 1953 by Abbas al-Azzawi at the Institut Français de Damas.
- the Risālat ḍiyāʾ al-ʿulūm wa-miṣbāʿ al-ʿulūm ("Treatise on the radiance of reason and the light of knowledge"), divided into four chapters, it also deals with matters of tawḥīd, cosmology and eschatology, as well as other theological questions.

== Sources ==
- Daftary, Farhad (2004). Ismaili Literature: A Bibliography of Sources and Studies. London and New York: I.B. Tauris. ISBN 978-0-8577-1386-5.
- Daftary, Farhad (2007). The Ismāʿı̄lı̄s: Their History and Doctrines (Second ed.). Cambridge: Cambridge University Press. ISBN 978-0-521-61636-2.
- Poonawala, Ismail K. (2008). "ʿAlī b. Ḥanẓala b. Abī Sālim". In Fleet, Kate; Krämer, Gudrun; Matringe, Denis; Nawas, John; Rowson, Everett (eds.). Encyclopaedia of Islam (3rd ed.). Brill Online. doi:10.1163/1573-3912_ei3_SIM_0322. ISSN 1873-9830.

Shia Islam titles
Ali ibn Hanzala Banu al-Walid al-Anf Died: 8 February 1229
Preceded by Ali ibn Muhammad ibn al-Walid	Da'i al-Mutlaq of Tayyibi Isma'ilism; 1215–1229 CE	Succeeded by Ahmad ibn Mubarak
