= Ibrahim ibn al-Husayn al-Hamidi =

Ibrahim ibn al-Husayn ibn Abi'l-Su'ud al-Hamidi (Arabic: إبراهيم بن الحسين بن أبي السعد الحامدي, romanized: Ibrāhīm ibn al-Ḥusayn ibn Abīʾl-Suʿud al-Ḥāmidī) was the second Tayyibi Isma'ili Dāʿī al-Muṭlaq in Yemen from 1151 to his death in 1162.

== Life ==
Ibrahim was a member of the Hamidi branch of the Banu Hamdan. According to the 12th-century Yemeni historian Umara al-Yamani, he was chosen as chief dāʿī by Queen Arwa al-Sulayhi already in 1132, but he was then replaced by the ruler of Aden, Saba ibn Abi'l-Su'ud ibn Zuray, possibly because Ibrahim espoused the Tayyibi sect in the schism with the Hafizis. Tayyibi sources mention none of this, however.

In 1138 he was chosen as chief assistant (maʾdhūn) by the first Tayyibi Dāʿī al-Muṭlaq, Dhu'ayb ibn Musa, and succeeded him upon his death in 1151, becoming thus the head of the Tayyibi community. He resided in Sana'a, under the protection of the city's ruler Hatim ibn Ahmad, who, although espousing the Hafizi sect, did not interfere with the Tayyibi missionary work. He chose Ali ibn al-Husayn ibn al-Walid (died 1159) and then his own son Hatim as maʾdhūn and designated successor. On his death in July 1162, Hatim succeeded him; his descendants monopolized the office of Dāʿī al-Muṭlaq until 1209.

== Theological works ==
As leader of the Tayyibi community, he introduced the Rasāʿil Ikhwān al-Safāʾ into Tayyibi literature, and in his own works incorporated many of the teachings of Hamid al-Din al-Kirmani. The resulting synthesis combined al-Kirmani's cosmology with mythical elements, and formed the foundation of the peculiar Tayyibi system of esoteric exegesis (haqā'iq). His major work was the Kitāb kanz al-walad ("Book of the Child’s Treasure"), which provided the basis for many future Tayyibi haqā'iq authors.

== Grave ==
The burial site of Ibrahim was unknown for a long time. His grave located in Ghail Bani Hamid at the outskirt of Sana'a, Yemen was successfully identified by Mohammed Burhanuddin on his visit to Yemen in 1961. His mausoleum was built in the year 2007.

== Sources ==
- Daftary, Farhad (2007). The Ismāʿı̄lı̄s: Their History and Doctrines (Second ed.). Cambridge: Cambridge University Press. ISBN 978-0-521-61636-2.
- Madelung, Wilferd (1971). "al-Ḥāmidī". In Lewis, B.; Ménage, V. L.; Pellat, Ch. & Schacht, J. (eds.). The Encyclopaedia of Islam, Second Edition. Volume III: H–Iram. Leiden: E. J. Brill. p. 134. doi:10.1163/1573-3912_islam_SIM_2675. OCLC 495469525.

Shia Islam titles
Ibrahim ibn al-Husayn al-Hamidi Dā'ī al-Mutlaq Died: 1162 CE, Ghail Bani Hamid, Sana'a, Yemen
Preceded by Dhu'ayb ibn Musa	2nd Dā'ī al-Mutlaq : 1151–1162CE	Succeeded by Hatim ibn Ibrahim
