= Methodius II of Constantinople =

Ecumenical Patriarch of Constantinople in 1240

- Ecumenical Patriarch of Constantinople
- Church: Church of Constantinople
- In office: Mid / late 1240
- Predecessor: Germanus II of Constantinople
- Successor: Manuel II of Constantinople

Personal details
- Born: Methodius
- Died: Late 1240
- Denomination: Eastern Orthodoxy

Methodius II of Constantinople (Greek: Μεθόδιος; died 1240) served as Ecumenical Patriarch of Constantinople (in exile due to the Fourth Crusade) for three months in 1240, when he died. He succeeded Germanus II.

Before he was elected Patriarch, he was abbot of the Hyacinth Monastery in Nicaea. His short patriarchy did not let him make important contributions.

== Bibliography ==
- Οικουμενικό Πατριαρχείο.
- «Νεώτερον Εγκυκλοπαιδικόν Λεξικόν Ηλίου» vol. 13, p. 172.

Eastern Orthodox Church titles
Preceded by Germanus II	Ecumenical Patriarch of Constantinople; In exile at Nicaea; 1240	Succeeded by Manuel II
