= Hatim ibn Ibrahim =

Hatim Mohiyuddin ibn Ibrahim
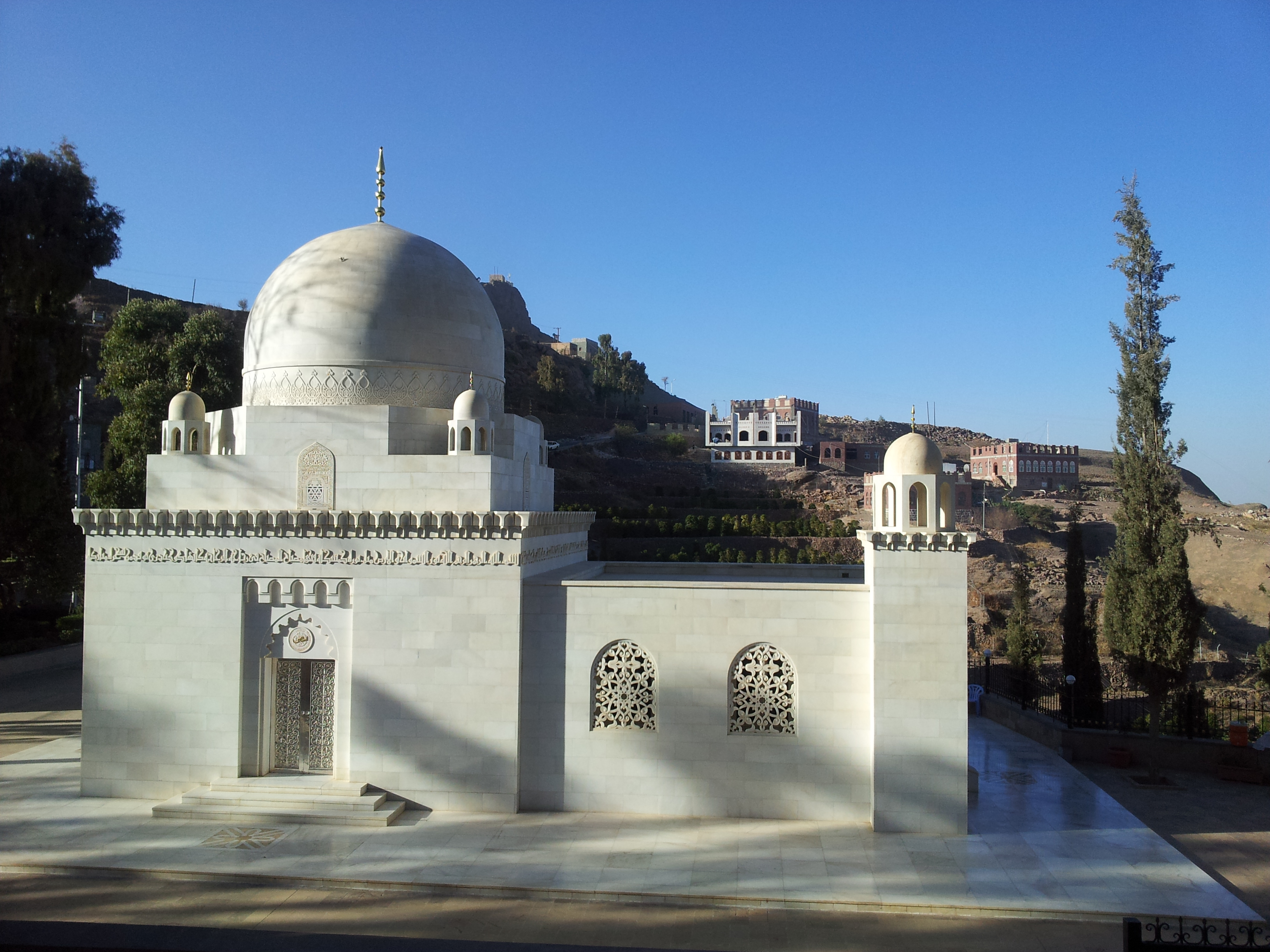
- Mausoleum

3rd Dāʿī al-Muṭlaq
- Remained Da'i al-Mutlaq: 1162–1199
- Predecessor: Ibrahim bin Husain
- Successor: Ali ibn Hatim
- Died: 6 November 1199 AD; Al Hutaib, Haraz, Yemen
- Burial: Al Hutaib, Haraz, Yemen

Hatim Mohiyuddin ibn Ibrahim al-Hamidi (Arabic: حاتم بن إبراهيم الحامدي, romanized: Ḥātim ibn Ibrāhīm al-Ḥāmidī) (died 16 Muharram 596 AH, 6 November 1199 AD), Al-Hutaib, Yemen) was the third Tayyibi Isma'ili Dāʿī al-Muṭlaq (Absolute Missionary). He was of the Banu Hamdan tribe of Yemen and succeeded his father, the second Dai Syedna Ibrahim, to the religious post.

Followers used to come to Syedna Hatim Mohiyuddin from all over Haraz and just below Hutaib was a cave known as Al-Kahf ul-N`eem where he used to preach to them.

In San'aa, the Dawat was ably managed by the Dai's Mazoon, Syedna Mohammad b. Taher al-Haaresi.

Dai period: 557–596 AH/ 1162–1199 AD

== Life ==
Syedna Hatim Mohiyuddin became the third Dai al-Mutlaq in Yemen after his father the second Dai Syedna Ibrahim al-Hamidi in 557 AH/1162. His ascension to the throne of the Dawat was challenged by a grandson of the first Dai Syedna Dhu'ayb ibn Musa, Ahsan bin Mohammad bin Syedna Dhu'ayb.

Syedna Hatim Mohiyuddin was the first Dai to venture into the Yemeni political field after the era under the rule of the Sulayhid Queen Arwa al-Sulayhi and her political patronage. The Zaydi Shia Imams of Yemen began to wage war against the Tayyibi Ismaili Shia (see Al-Mutawakkil Ahmad bin Sulayman). It is in this context that Syedna Hatim became interested in territorial acquisition and becoming a military power as a security requisition for the Taiyabi Ismailis.

Banu Zuwahi, offered mountain-peak fortress of Kawkaban near San'aa to Syedna Hatim Mohiyuddin in 561/1166. San'aa was under the rule of Sultan Ali b. Hatim al-Yami of the Hamdan tribe. See Hamdanids (Yemen) for further information. Perceiving a threat to his own sovereignty, Sultan Ali proceeded to lay siege to Kawkaban. A trusted associate of the Dai, Ahmad al-Hibri betrayed him. Ahmad al-Hibri accepted a bribe from Sultan Ali, gave him vital information about the Dai's arrangements, and persuaded others in Kawkaban to turn against him, and forced Hatim to leave Kawkaban. He went to Lu'lu'a and Ray'an, two smaller fortresses some distance away. But Sultan Ali pursued him there with his troops and the Dai's reluctance to cause further strife among the Hamdan qabila prompted him to relinquish his hopes for acquiring territories in the San'aa region. He decided to move to the mountainous Haraz region, where there had been Ismailis from the time of the first Sulayhid ruler. In the next few years a series of successful military expeditions gradually brought most of Haraz under the Dai's control. The core of his army was the Ya'aabir qabila, and their chief Amir Sabaa b. Yusuf.

== Works ==
Amongst his many works of literature are: Al-Majalis al Hatimiyah, Risalat Tohfatil Qulub, Zahru Bazr al-Haqa'iq, Tanbeehul Ghafileen and Al-Shumus ul- Zaherah. In his work he clarified position of succession regarding Ismaili Imams after Imam Jafar. Syedna Hatim Mohiyuddin wrote: "The eldest of these(sons of Imam Jafer) shall die in life time appointing as successor seventh imam."

== Death ==
Syedna Hatim Mohiyuddin died on Saturday 16 Muharram 596/7 November 1199 in Hutayb. His tomb was built by Syedna Mohammed Burhanuddin in the year 1971. It was further renovated and rebuilt in 2007.

== Gallery ==
This is where Syedna Hatim Mohiyuddin used to go and pray. It is located on a mountain near his Mausoleum

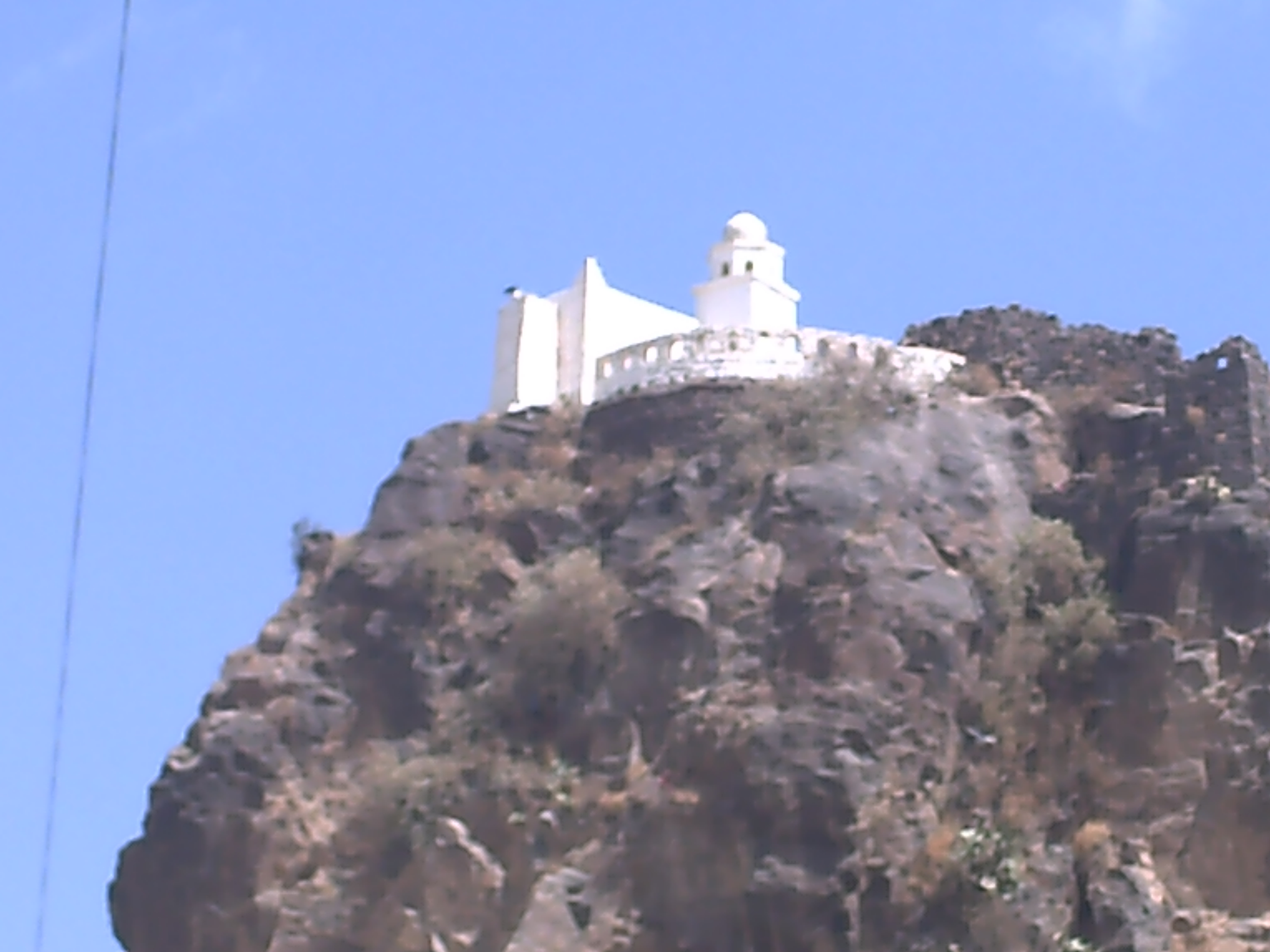
Hatimi Mosque under focus

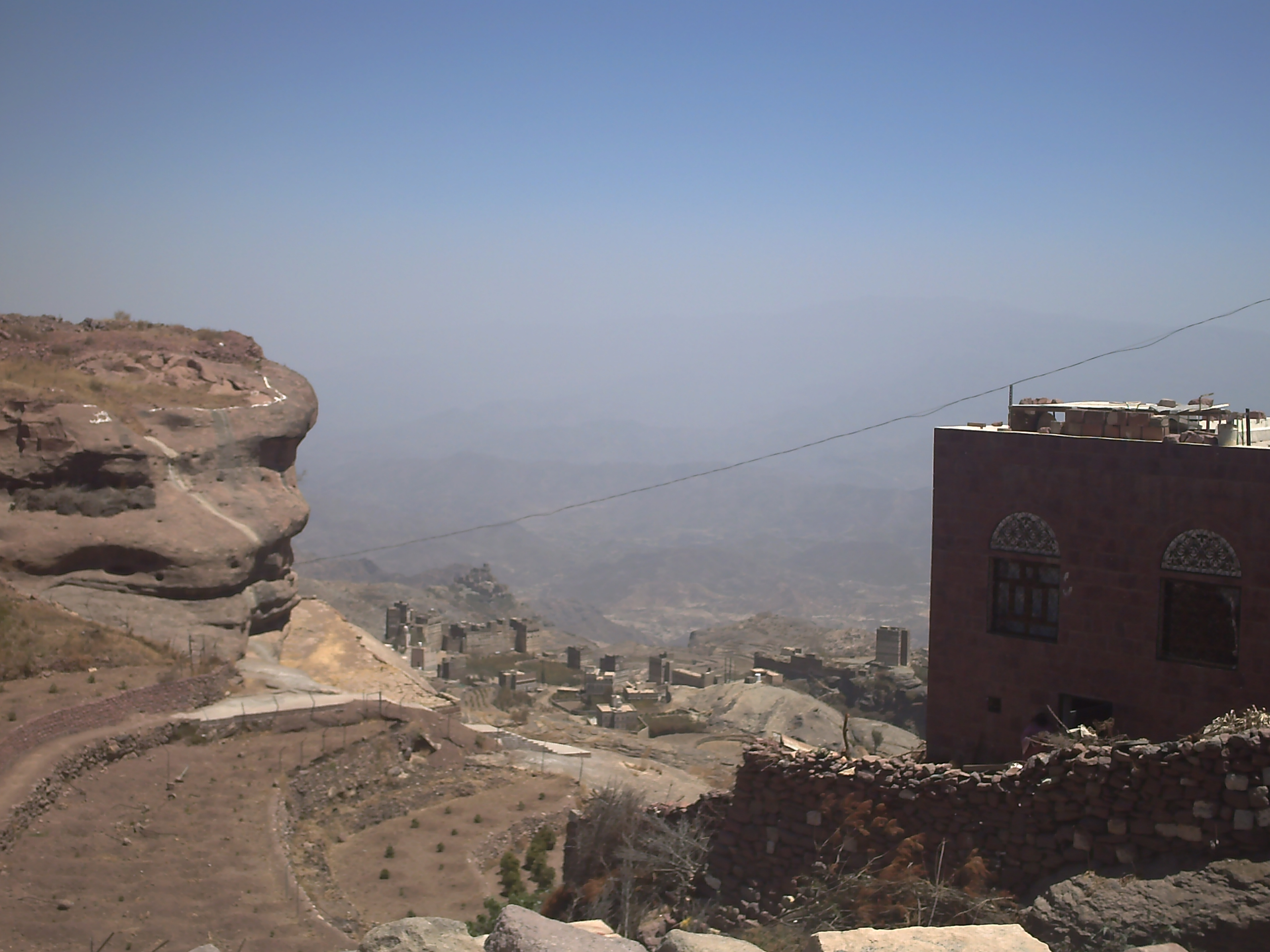
Place of preaching and writing, platform under curved roof of mountains, Al-Kahf ul-N`eem

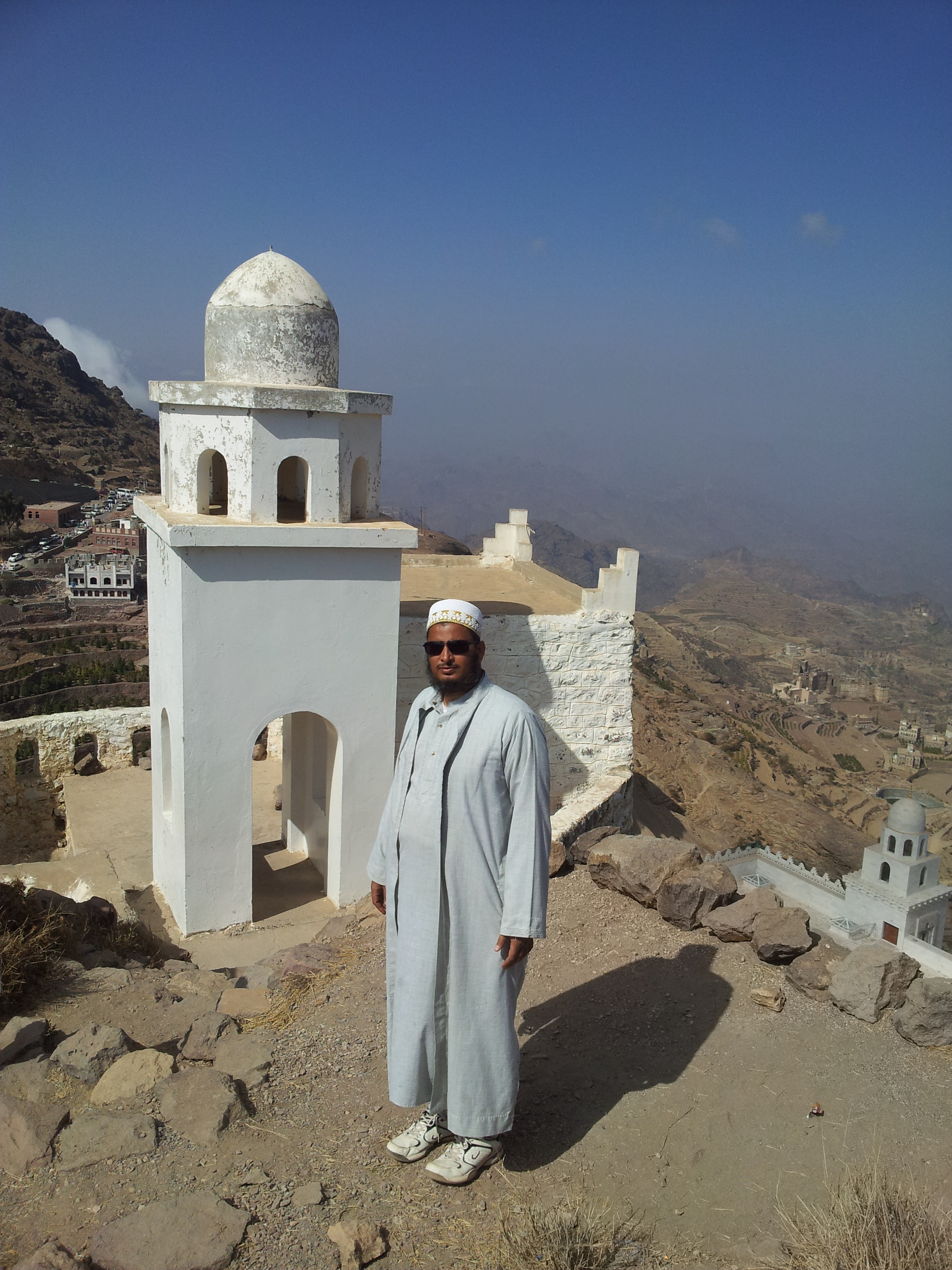
Minaret of the Syedna Hatim Mohiyuddin Mosque

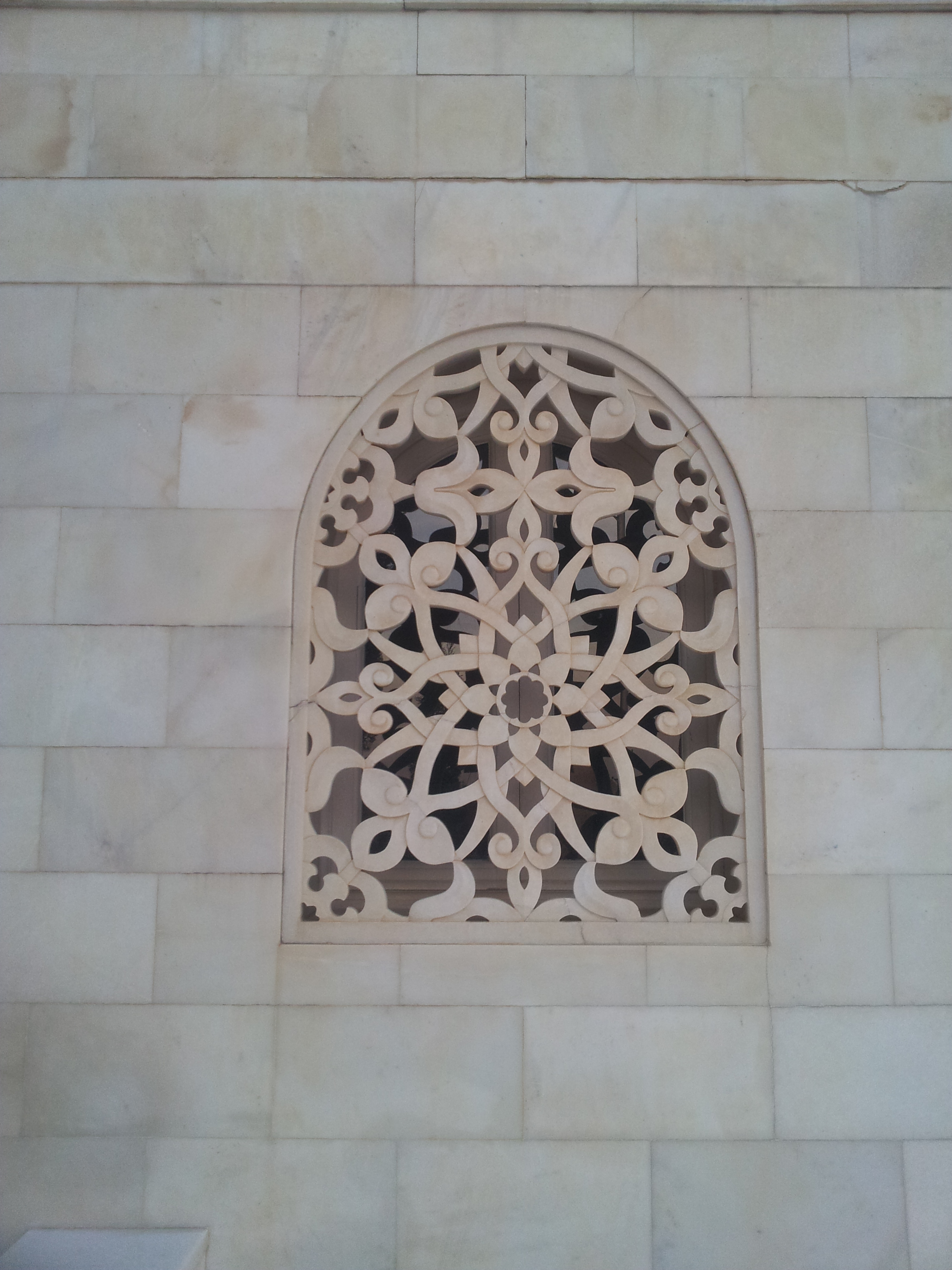
Shubbaq, Syedna Hatim Mohiyuddin Rauza

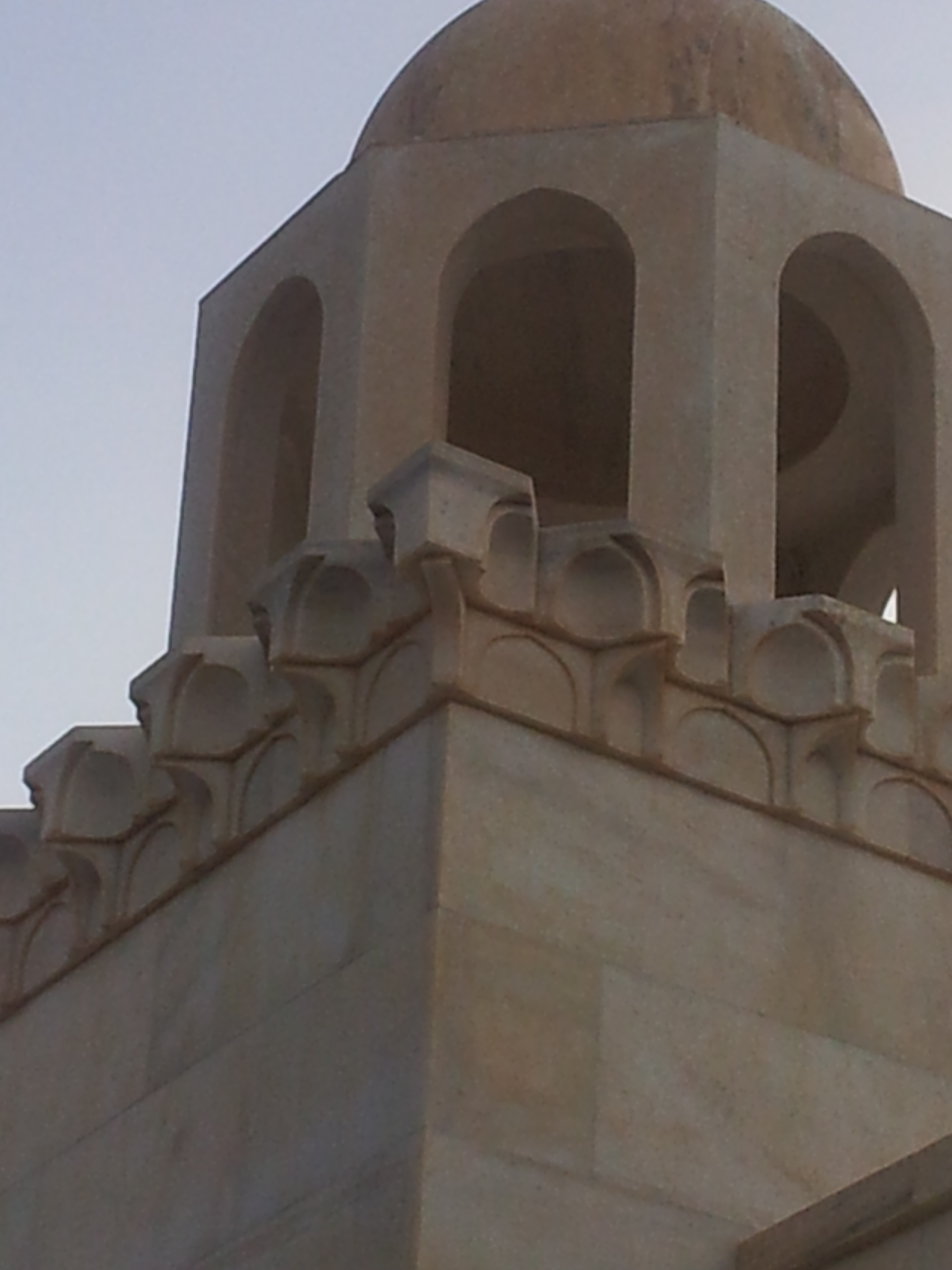
A replica of Mukarnas at Syedna Hatim Rauza, taken from Juyushi Mosque

== Sources ==
- Daftary, Farhad (2007). The Ismāʿı̄lı̄s: Their History and Doctrines (Second ed.). Cambridge: Cambridge University Press. ISBN 978-0-521-61636-2.
- Madelung, Wilferd (1971). "al-Ḥāmidī". In Lewis, B.; Ménage, V. L.; Pellat, Ch. & Schacht, J. (eds.). The Encyclopaedia of Islam, Second Edition. Volume III: H–Iram. Leiden: E. J. Brill. p. 134. doi:10.1163/1573-3912_islam_SIM_2675. OCLC 495469525.

Shia Islam titles
Hatim ibn Ibrahim Dā'ī al-Mutlaq Died: 6 November 1199 AD, Al-Hutaib, Yemen
Preceded by Ibrahim bin Husain	3rd Dā'ī al-Mutlaq : 1162–1199 CE	Succeeded by Ali ibn Hatim
