= Maximus II of Constantinople =

Ecumenical Patriarch of Constantinople in 1216

- Ecumenical Patriarch of Constantinople
- Church: Church of Constantinople
- In office: 3 June 1216 – December 1216
- Predecessor: Theodore II of Constantinople
- Successor: Manuel I of Constantinople

Personal details
- Died: December 1216
- Denomination: Eastern Orthodoxy

Maximus II of Constantinople (Greek: Μάξιμος; died December 1216) was Ecumenical Patriarch of Constantinople from 3 June to December 1216. He had been abbot of the monastery of the Akoimetoi and was the confessor of the Nicaean emperor Theodore I Laskaris before he became patriarch. George Akropolites and Nikephoros Kallistos Xanthopoulos are highly critical of Maximus II, suggesting that he was "uneducated" and that the only reason he was made patriarch was his intrigue into the palace's women's quarters. Akropolites writes that he "paid court to the women's quarters and was in turn courted by it; for it was nothing else which raised him to such eminence." Maximus II was Patriarch-in-exile as at the time his titular seat was occupied by the Latin Patriarchate of Constantinople, and he lived in Nicaea. He died in office after only six months on the patriarchal throne.

== Notes and references ==
Eastern Orthodox Church titles
Preceded by Theodore II	Ecumenical Patriarch of Constantinople; In exile at Nicaea; 1216	Succeeded by Manuel I
