= Manuel I of Constantinople =

Ecumenical Patriarch of Constantinople from 1217 to 1222

- Ecumenical Patriarch of Constantinople
- Church: Church of Constantinople
- In office: May 1217 – May/June 1222
- Predecessor: Maximus II of Constantinople
- Successor: Germanus II of Constantinople

Personal details
- Born: Manuel Sarantenos or Karantenos or Charitopoulos
- Died: May or June 1222
- Denomination: Eastern Orthodoxy

Manuel I Sarantenos or Karantenos or Charitopoulos (Greek: Μανουὴλ Σαραντηνός/Καραντηνός or Χαριτόπουλος; died May or June 1222) was the Patriarch of Constantinople from May 1217 to May/June 1222.

== Biography ==
He seems to have been called "the Philosopher", George Akropolites says he was "a philosopher, it seems, in deed, and so named by the people". Manuel I was Patriarch-in-exile as at the time his titular seat was occupied by the Latin Patriarchate of Constantinople, and he lived in Nicaea. Before the sack of 1204, Manuel was a deacon and hypatos ton philosophon in Constantinople. This is likely the source of his epithet "the Philosopher".

Under Manuel I, Saint Sava had become an archbishop and an autocephalous Serbian Orthodox Church was formed in the territory of the Serbian Kingdom of Stefan the First-Crowned.

Manuel I is noted for his role in a diplomatic interplay between the Nicaean emperor Theodore I Laskaris and Robert I, Latin Emperor, in 1222. Robert I had approached Theodore I for a peace treaty and the latter offered his daughter Eudokia in marriage to cement the deal. But Theodore I had married Maria of Courtenay, Robert I's sister, in 1217. Manuel I is thus reported by George Akropolites to have blocked the betrothal, twice negotiated, on religious-legal grounds: Robert, Theodore's brother-in-law, could not also become his son-in-law as this was an "illegal union" and constituted incest as it was within the third degree of kinship.

== Notes and references ==
Eastern Orthodox Church titles
Preceded by Maximus II	Ecumenical Patriarch of Constantinople; In exile at Nicaea; 1217 – 1222	Succeeded by Germanus II
