= Theodore II of Constantinople =

Ecumenical Patriarch of Constantinople from 1213 to 1216

- Ecumenical Patriarch of Constantinople
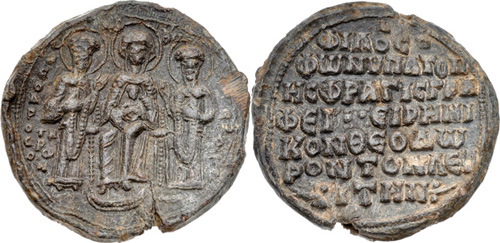
- Seal of Theodore Eirenikos when he was hypatos ton philosophon, ca. 1208–1213
- Church: Church of Constantinople
- In office: 28 September 1213 – 31 January 1216
- Predecessor: Michael IV of Constantinople
- Successor: Maximus II of Constantinople

Personal details
- Born: Theodore Kopas or Koupas
- Died: 31 January 1216
- Denomination: Eastern Orthodoxy

Theodore II of Constantinople (born Theodoros Eirenikos; Greek: Θεόδωρος Εἰρηνικός; died 31 January 1216), also known as Theodore Kopas or Koupas (Κωπᾶς/Κουπᾶς), was a high-ranking Byzantine official and chief minister during most of the reign of the Byzantine emperor Alexios III Angelos (r. 1195–1203). After the fall of Constantinople to the Fourth Crusade, he fled to the Empire of Nicaea, where he became a monk and served as Ecumenical Patriarch of Constantinople in exile in 1213–1216.

== Political career ==
An intelligent, well-spoken and educated man, he rose to power following the disgrace and exile of Alexios III's hitherto favourite official, Constantine Mesopotamites, in autumn 1197. Theodore II succeeded Mesopotamites in his confidential and influential palace post of epi tou kanikleiou (secretary of the imperial inkpot) and as chief minister. He also held the senior court rank of sebastos. According to the account of the contemporary historian Niketas Choniates, Theodore II feared that he would share Mesopotamites' fate, and therefore exercised his power with great restraint. He was anxious not to displease the hereditary aristocracy that dominated the imperial court and that had undermined Mesopotamites' position. To that effect, he also neglected to undertake any of the reforms that the Empire desperately needed.

== Exile and church career ==
In April 1204, Constantinople fell to the soldiers of the Fourth Crusade, and like many Byzantine leaders, Theodore II fled the city and sought refuge in Asia Minor. There Theodore II was tonsured as a monk. In 1209, the newly proclaimed Nicaean emperor, Theodore I Laskaris, named him to the post of chartophylax of the Ecumenical Patriarchate of Constantinople, re-established in Nicaean exile. Theodore I Laskaris also awarded him with the title hypatos ton philosophon, a prestigious title given to the head of the faculty of philosophy in Constantinople.

On 28 September 1213, Theodore II was elected as Ecumenical Patriarch of Constantinople by the patriarchal synod. His tenure was marked by his open confrontation with the Catholic Church, especially over the legitimacy of the Latin Patriarchate of Constantinople and of Catholic control over the Greek Orthodox populations ruled by Frankokratia.

Theodore II of Constantinople died on 31 January 1216.

== Bibliography ==
- Brand, Charles M. (1968). Byzantium Confronts the West, 1180–1204. Cambridge, Massachusetts: Harvard University Press. LCCN 67-20872.
- Kazhdan, Alexander, ed. (1991). The Oxford Dictionary of Byzantium. Oxford and New York: Oxford University Press. ISBN 0-19-504652-8.
- Vougiouklaki, Penelope (2003). "Theodore II Irenikos". Encyclopedia of the Hellenic World, Eastern Mediterranean. Foundation of the Hellenic World.

Eastern Orthodox Church titles
Preceded by Michael IV	Ecumenical Patriarch of Constantinople; In exile at Nicaea; 1213 – 1216	Succeeded by Maximus II
