= Muhammad ibn Abdallah al-Aftah =

8th-century contested figure in Shia Islam

Muhammad ibn Abd Allah al-Aftah ibn Ja'far al-Sadiq was a figure whose existence is contested: a portion of the Fathite Shia Muslims (followers of Abdullah al-Aftah ibn Ja'far al-Sadiq), believed that Muhammad was the son of Imam Abdullah al-Aftah (died 766 CE), whom they believed to be the Imam after his father Ja'far al-Sadiq. This assertion is contested by others, including many Fathites, who believe that Abdullah died without issue.

When Abdullah al-Aftah died without an issue to succeed him in the Imamate, a portion of his followers believed in the necessity of the continuation of the Imamate in the children and the grandchildren of the Imam through pure vertical inheritance. Due to this they could not shift to the belief in the Imamate of the brother of Abdullah al-Aftah, Musa al-Kadhim. They therefore believed that Abdullah secretly had a son, claiming that this son was the Mahdi. They argued: "His name corresponds to the famous Prophetic hadith (of Muhammad): 'His name (i.e. the Mahdi) is my name (i.e. Muhammad), the name of his father is the name of my father (i.e. Abdullah).'"

Some claimed that he had a son named Sayed Alawi.

== Some of his ancestors and relatives ==
İbrahim
İsmail
Qedarites
Adnān
Mālik
Quraysh; Fihr
Harith	Muhārib	Gālib
Salabah	Lu'ay
Sûrayr	Kâ'b	Sayl
Mûrrah	Sa'd
Hind
Kilab ibn Murrah	Fatimah bint Sa'd
Qusai ibn Kilab	Hubba bint Hulail	Zuhrah ibn Kilab
Waqida bint Amr	Abd Manaf ibn Qusai	ʿAbd Manāf ibn Zuhrah	ʿĀtika
Nawfal ibn Abd Manaf	Atikah bint Murrah
ʿAbd Shams ibnʿAbdManaf	Hala	Barra	Muttalib ibn Abd Manaf	Hashim ibn 'Abd Manaf	Hashemites
Banu Nawfal	Umayya ibn Abd Shams	Barra	Wahb ibn 'Abd Manaf	Abusayfah	‘Abd al-Muttalib	Asad ibn Hashim	Nazle
Harb	Abu al-'As ibn Umayyah	Aminah bint Wahb	‘Abd Allah ibn ‘Abd al-Muttalib	Abu Talib ibn ‘Abd al-Muttalib	Hamza ibn ‘Abd al-Muttalib	‘Abbas ibn ‘Abd al-Muttalib
Abu Sufyan ibn Harb	Al-Hakam ibn Abi al-'As	Affan ibn Abi al-'As	Muhammed (Family tree)	Khadijah (Daughters)	Ali (Family tree)	Khawlah bint Ja'far	ʿAbd Allâh bin `Abbâs
Muawiyah I	Marwan ibn al-Hakam	Uthman ibn Affan	Ruqayyah bint Muhammad	Fatimah Zahra	Muhammad ibn al-Hanafiyyah	Al-Mukhtar al-Thaqafi (Kaysān’îyyah)	ʿAli bin ʿAbd Allāh
Umayyads	Uthman ibn Abu-al-Aas	Hasan al-mujtaba	Umm Ishaq bint Talha	Hussein ibn Ali (Family)	Shahrbanu	Abu Hāshim al-Hānafiyyah (Kaysān’īyyah)	Muhammad "al-Imām"
Yazid I	Zayd ibn al-Hasan	Hasan al-Mu'thannā	Fātimāh	Ali Zayn al-‘Āb’i-Dīn	Jayda al-Sindhi	As-Saffah	Ibrāheem "al-Imām"
Muawiyah II	Hasan ibn Zayd ibn Hasan	ʿAbd Allāh al-Kāmīl	Farwah bint al-Qasim	Muhammad al-Baqir (Imāmah)	Zayd ash-Shaheed (Zaidiyyah)	Abbasids	Jāʿfar ibn Abī Tālīb
Ali Zayn al-‘Āb’i-Dīn	Ismā‘il ibn Hassan	Muhammad al-Nafs al-Zakiyya	Hamīdah al-Barbariyyah Khātūn	Jāʿfar al-Sādiq (Imamāh‘Shi'ā)	Fatima bint al-Hussain'l-Athram	Hasan ibn Zayd’ûl-Alavī (Tabaristan)	ʿAbd Allāh ibn Jāʿfar
‘Umar al-Ashraf	Muhammed ibn Ismā‘il	Idris ibn ʿAbd Allāh	Ummul Banīn Najmah	Musa al-Kadhim (Athnā‘ashariyyah)	Ismā‘il (Ismā‘il’īyyah)	Yāhyā ibn Zayd’ûl-Alavī	Ismā‘il ibn ʿAbd Allāh
‘Alī	Zayyed	Idrisids	Sabīkah Khayzurān	Ali al-Ridha	Muhammed	Hussein	ʿAbd Allāh
al-Hussayn	Dā‘ī al-Kabīr	Ibrāhim	Sumānah	M. al-Jawād	Al-Wafi	Yāhyā	al-Hussayn
‘Alī	Al-ṣāghīr	Yāhyā	Hadīthah/Sūsan/Savīl	‘Alī al-Hādī	At-Tāqī	‘Umar	Fatımā
al-Nāṣīr	Narjis	Hasan al-Askari	Ar-Rāḍī	Yāhyā Kufī
Alavids	Muhammad Mahdi	Mahdi Billāh
Twelve Imams (Twelvers)	Fatimids (Ismailism)	Al-Aftāh (Aftāhīyyah)
Al-Qā'im	Muhammad
Al-Mansur
Al-Mu'izz
Al-Aziz
Al-Hakim
Az-Zahir
Al-Mustansir
Nizār al-Muṣṭafá (Nizārīyyah)	Al-Mustā‘lī (Mustā‘līyyah)
Al-Āmīr
Alamut Castle (Hassasins)	Al-Hāfeez (Ḥāfīzīyyah)	Aṭ-Ṭāyyīb (Ṭāyyībīyyah)
Al-Zāfīr
Nizārī Imāmah	Al-Fā'īz	Taiyabi Dā'ĩs
Al-'Āḍīd
Nizārī Ismāilism	Bohras-Dā'ĩs
Ayyubids

== See also ==
- Descendants of Ali ibn Abi Talib

Muhammad ibn Abdullah al-Aftah of the Ahl al-Bayt Born: (existence disputed)
Shia Islam titles
Preceded by Abdullah al-Aftah ibn Ja'far al-Sadiq	8th Imam of a faction of Fathite Shia Islam; 766-? CE	Succeeded by Schism became defunct
