= Abdallah al-Aftah =

Eldest son of Ja'far al-Sadiq (died 766)

ʿAbdallāh al-Afṭaḥ ibn Jaʿfar al-Ṣādiq (Arabic: عبدالله الأفطح بن جعفر الصادق, d. 766 CE / 149 A.H.) was the eldest son of Ja'far al-Sadiq (after al-Sadiq's death) and the full-brother of Isma'il ibn Jafar. Abdallah's title "al-Aftah" derives from the Arabic words "aftah al-ra’s" (broad-headed) or "aftah al-rijlayn" (broad-footed) used to describe his appearance.

== Life ==
During the lifetime of his father, Abdallah al-Aftah had supported the revolt of his relative Muhammad al-Nafs al-Zakiyya.

Following Ja'far al-Sadiq's death, the majority of Ja'far's followers accepted Abdallah al-Aftah as their new Imam. These followers were known as the Fathites and, according to the Mu'tazili heresiographer Abul-Qasim al-Balkhi al-Ka‘bi (d.319 A.H. / 931 CE), they were the biggest and most important section of the followers of Ja'far al-Sadiq. To support his claims, Abdallah al-Aftah seems to have claimed a 2nd Nass from his father (following Ismā'īl's demise) and his adherents cited a supposed Hadith from Ja'far al-Sadiq to the effect that the Imamate must be transmitted through the eldest son of the Imam. However, when Abdallah al-Aftah died childless about 70 days after the death of his father, the bulk of his supporters went over to his brother Musa al-Kazim. Other Fathites considered Abdallah al-Aftah the 7th Imam and Musa al-Kazim the 8th Imam, while others believed the Imamate came to an end when Abdallah al-Aftah died. Another group invented a son for Abdallah al-Aftah, called Muhammad ibn Abdallah al-Aftah, because they unconditionally believed the Imamate could only be inherited from father to son, rather than from brother to brother. This group also claimed that Muhammad ibn Abdallah al-Aftah was the promised Mahdi.

== As "Sāhib al-Haqq" ==
In a letter sent to the Isma'ili community in Yemen by the first Fatimid caliph, Abdallah al-Mahdi Billah, which was reproduced by Ja'far ibn Mansur al-Yaman, Abdallah al-Aftah was referred as Sāhib al-Haqq or the legitimate successor of Ja'far al-Sadiq, in an attempt to explain the genealogy of his ancestors. Instead of tracing his descent to Isma'il ibn Jafar and his son Muhammad ibn Ismail, al-Mahdi Billah designated al-Aftah as his forefather. According to al-Mahdi Billah, al-Aftah had called himself 'Isma'il ibn Ja'far' for the sake of taqiyya, and each of his successors had assumed the name Muhammad. Al-Mahdi Billah explained the genealogy of the Fatimid Caliphs and claimed Fatimid ancestry by declaring himself to be ʿAli ibn al-Ḥusayn ibn Aḥmad ibn ʿAbadullāh ibn ʿAbd Allāh ibn Jaʿfar al-Sadiq. But the Imamah (Ismaili doctrine) was later formulated in a different manner since ʿAbdallah al-Mahdi Billah's explanation of his ancestry was not accepted by his successors.

== Genealogy ==
Jāʿfar al-Sādiq (Imamāh‘Shi'ā)	Fatimah bint al-Hussain'l-Athram b. al-Ḥasan b. Ali
Al-Aftāh (Fatahīyyah)	Ismā‘il (Ismā‘il’īyyah)
Muhammad	Muhammed
Al-Wafi
At-Tāqī
Ar-Rāḍī
Mahdi Billāh
Fatimids (Ismailism)
Al-Qā'im
Al-Mansur
Al-Mu'izz
Al-Aziz
Al-Hakim
Az-Zahir
Al-Mustansir
Nizār al-Muṣṭafá (Nizāriyyah)	Muhammad ibn Abū Tamīm	Al-Musta‘lī (Musta‘līyyah)
Al-Āmīr
Alamut Castle (Hassasins)	Al-Hāfiz (Ḥāfiziyyah)	Aṭ-Ṭayyib (Ṭayyibiyyah)
Al-Zāfir	Yūssuf
Nizārī Imāmah	Al-Fā'iz	Taiyabi Dā'ĩs
Al-'Āḍīd
Nizārī Ismāilism	Dawoodi Dā'ĩs

== See also ==
- Descendants of Ali ibn Abi Talib

== Bibliography ==
- Sachedina, Abdulaziz Abdulhussein (1981). Islamic messianism: the idea of Mahdī in twelver Shīʻism. SUNY Press. ISBN 0873954424.
- Crone, Patricia (2005). Medieval Islamic political thought. New Edinburgh Islamic surveys (reprint ed.). Edinburgh University Press. ISBN 0748621946.
- Daftary, Farhad (1992). The Isma'ilis: Their History and Doctrines (reprint ed.). Cambridge University Press. ISBN 0521429749.
- Halm, Heinz (2004). Shi'ism. New Edinburgh Islamic surveys (reprint ed.). Edinburgh University Press. ISBN 0748618880.

Abdallah al-Aftah of the Ahl al-Bayt
Shia Islam titles
Preceded by Ja'far al-Sadiq	7th Imam of Fathite Shia Islam; 765–766 CE	Succeeded by died without issue
Preceded by Ja'far al-Sadiq	7th Imam of Fathite Shia Islam; 765–766 CE	Succeeded by Muhammad ibn Abdallah al-Aftah (existence disputed)
