= Husaynids =

Descendants of Husayn ibn Ali, grandson of Muhammad

Al-Husayni الحسيني
- Hashemite Arab Tribe
- Ethnicity: Arab
- Nisba: al-Husayni
- Location: Arabia
- Descended from: Husayn ibn Ali
- Parent tribe: Banu Hashim
- Demonym: Husaynis
- Branches: Al-Ja'fari; Al-Musawi
- Language: Arabic
- Religion: Islam
- Surnames: Al-Husseini, Al Ja'fari, Al-Musawi

The Husaynids (Arabic: بنو الحسين, romanized: Banū al-Ḥusayn or حسینیون, Ḥusayniyyūn) are a branch of the Alids who are descendants of Husayn ibn Ali, a grandson of the Islamic prophet Muhammad. It is one of the two main branches of the ashrāf (the other being the descendants of Husyan's brother Hasan, the Hasanids).

== Genealogical trees ==
=== Family tree of Husayn ibn Ali ===
Muhammad (Islamic prophet)	Khadijah bint Khuwaylid
Fatimah	Ali (1st Imam in Shia) (Rashidun Caliph in Sunni)
Muhsin ibn Ali	Hasan ibn Ali (Sunni Rashidun Caliph) (Imam in Twelver/Zaidi and Musta'li Shia)	Husayn ibn Ali (Imam in Twelver/Zaidi and Musta'li/Nizari Shia)	Umm Kulthum bint Ali	Zaynab bint Ali
Shahrbanu	Rubab bint Imra al-Qais	Layla bint Abi Murrah al-Thaqafi	Umm Ishaq bint Talhah
Fatima Sughra	Sakinah bint Husayn	Ali al-Asghar ibn Husayn	Sukayna bint Husayn	Ali al-Akbar ibn Husayn	Fatimah bint Husayn
Mother of ‘Umar	Ali ibn Husayn Zayn al-Abidin; 4th Twelver/Zaidi and 3rd Musta'li/Nizari Imam	Fatimah bint Hasan	Jayda al-Sindhi	Ali al-Akbar ibn Husayn
‘Umar al-Ashraf	Muhammad al-Baqir; 5th Twelver and 4th Musta'li/Nizari Imam	Umm Farwah bint al-Qasim (Umm Farwa)	Zayd ibn Ali; 5th Zaidi Imam	Ali al-Asghar ibn Husayn
‘Alī	Hamidah Khatun	Ja'far al-Sadiq; 6th Twelver and 5th Musta'li/Nizari Imam	Fatima bint al-Hussain'l-Athram ibn al-Hasan ibn Ali	Zaynab bint Husayn
al-Ḥasan	Musa al-Kadhim; 7th Twelver Imam	Abdullah al-Aftah (eldest son)	Isma'il ibn Ja'far elder son, but predescesed his father, 6th Musta'li/Nizari Imam	Unknown	Umm Kulthum bint Husayn
‘Alī	Ummul Banīn Najmah	Abd al-Azim al-Hasani claimed as ancestor of the Safavids
al-Nāṣir al-Kabīr	Ali al-Ridha; 8th Twelver Imam	Sabīkah a.k.a. Khayzurān	Muhammad ibn Isma'il; 7th Sevener/Musta'li/Nizari Imam	Fatima
Sumānah	Muhammad al-Jawad; 9th Twelver Imam	Unknown	Ahmad al-Wafi; 8th Musta'li/Nizari Imam	Other issue
Ali al-Hadi; 10th Twelver Imam	Hâdise (Hadīthah) / Suzan (Sūsan) / Sevil (Savīl)	Other issue	Muhammad at-Taqi; 9th Musta'li/Nizari Imam	Unknown
Hasan al-Askari; 11th Twelver Imam	Narjis	Radi Abdullah al-Husayn; 10th Musta'li/Nizari Imam from here descends the Fatimid Caliphs and later the Ismaili Imams
Muhammad al-Mahdi; 12th Twelver Imam

== Dynasties ==
- the various lines of Shi'a imams are largely Husaynid, being descended patrilineally from Husayn ibn Ali, the third imam. This applies to the Twelver Shi'a imams, the Zaydiyya, and the various lines of Isma'ili imams.
- the Isma'ili Fatimid dynasty and the later Aga Khans.
- a Zaydi dynasty, descended from Hasan al-Utrush, that intermittently ruled Tabaristan in the early 10th century.
- the position of Sharif of Medina was in the hands of the Husaynid Banu Muhanna dynasty.
- Al Qasimi of Sharjah and Ras Al Khaimah, United Arab Emirates.
- The House of Hasib of Rajhat in Bihar are descendants from Syed Yaqub Halabi, a Qazi from Aleppo who travelled with Muhammad of Ghor to India.
- Pontianak Sultanate of Indonesia ruled the region of Pontianak until 1950.
- Bendahara of Pahang and Terengganu, Malaysia.
- Temenggong dynasty of Johor, Malaysia.
- Isaaq clan from Somaliland, Yemen and Djibouti
  - Tolje'lo Dynasty of the Isaaq kingdom
  - Guled Dynasty of the Isaaq Sultanate
- al-Husayni family, a prominent Palestinian clan formerly based in Jerusalem, which claims descent from Husayn ibn Ali
