= Sevener =

Branch of Isma'ilism

al-Ismāʿīliyya al-khāliṣa / al-Ismāʿīliyya al-wāqifa or Sevener (Arabic: سبعية) was a branch of Ismā'īlī Shīʻa. They broke off from the more numerous Twelvers after the death of Jafar al-Sadiq in 765 AD. They became known as "Seveners" because they believed that Isma'il ibn Ja'far was the seventh and last Imam (hereditary leader of the Muslim community in the direct line of Ali). They believed his son, Muhammad ibn Isma'il, would return and bring about an age of justice as Mahdi. Their most well-known and active branch were the Qarmatians.

== History, Shia schisms, and Seveners ==
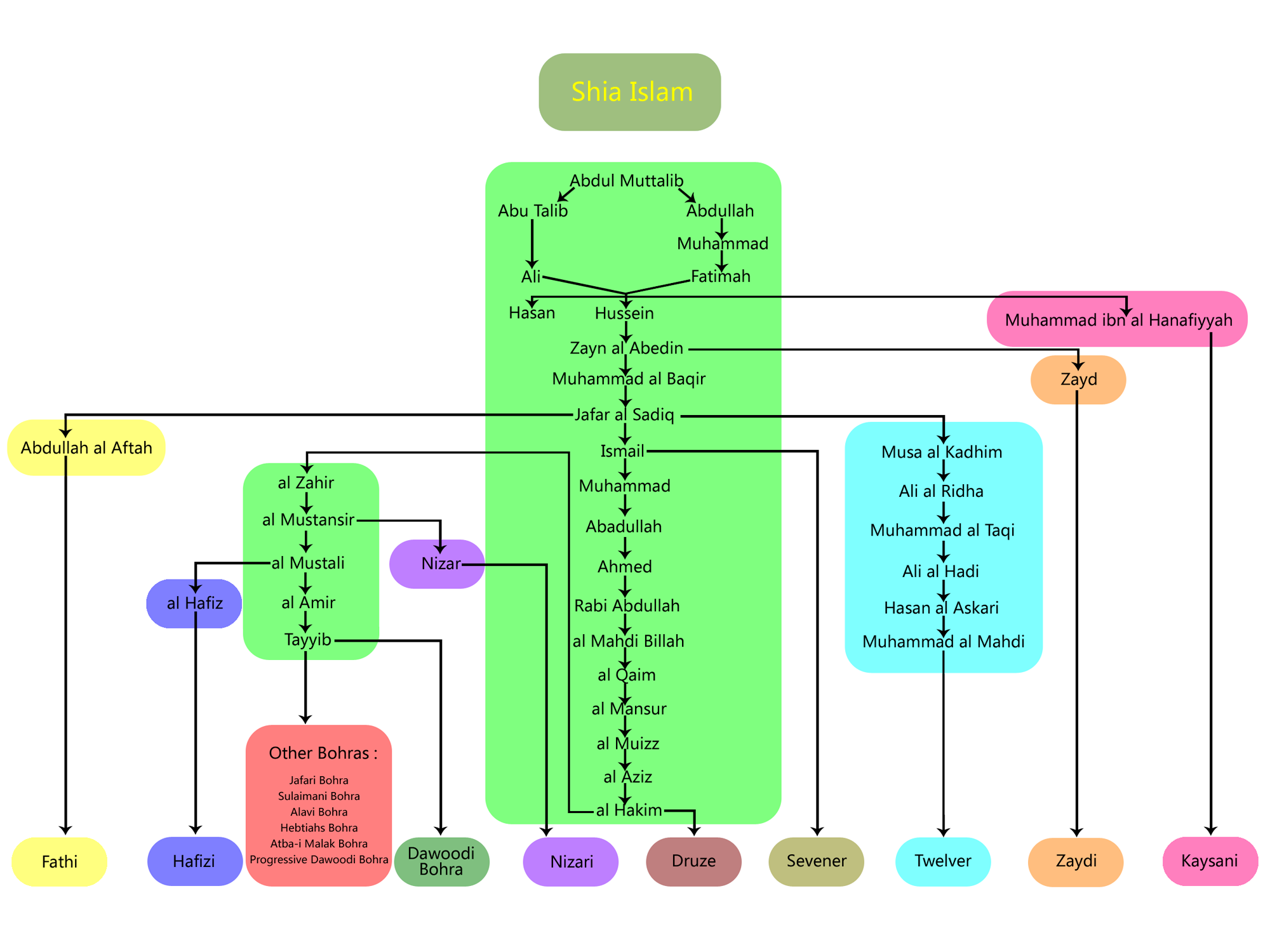
Branching of Ismā'īlīsm within the Shi'a Islam at a glance. (Note: Kaysani's Imam Hanafiyyah is descendant of Ali from Ali's wife Khawlah, not Fatimah.)

=== Seveners and the Fatimid dynasty ===
Sevener and Fatimid Dynasty

== List of Imams ==
Imām	Sevener al-Ismāʿīliyya al-khāliṣa Imām	Period
1	Ali – First Ismā'īlī Imām	(632–661)
2	Hasan ibn Ali – Second Ismā'īlī Imām	(661–669)
3	Husayn ibn Ali – Third Ismā'īlī Imām	(669–680)
4	Ali ibn Husayn Zayn al-Abidin – Fourth Ismā'īlī Imām	(680–713)
5	Muhammad al-Baqir – Fifth Ismā'īlī Imām	(713–733)
6	Ja'far al-Sadiq – Sixth Ismā'īlī Imām	(733–765)
7	Isma'il ibn Ja'far – Seventh Ismā'īlī Imām	(765–775)

Sometimes "Sevener" is used to refer to Ismā'īlīs overall, though mainstream Musta'li and Nizari Isma'ilis have far more than seven imams.

== Ismaili imams who were not accepted as legitimate by Seveners ==
The following Ismaili imams after Mahdi had been considered as heretics of dubious origins by certain Qarmatian groups who refused to acknowledge the imamate of the Fatimids and clung to their belief in the coming of the Mahdi.

- Abadullah ibn Muhammad (Ahmad al-Wafi) (813–829)
- Ahmad ibn Abadullah (Muhammad at-Taqi) (829–840)
- Husayn ibn Ahmad (Radi Abdullah) (840–881)
- Abdallah al-Mahdi Billah (881–934) (Founder of Fatimid Caliphate)

== See also ==
- List of extinct Shia sects
- Isma'ilism
