= Imamate in Shia Islam =

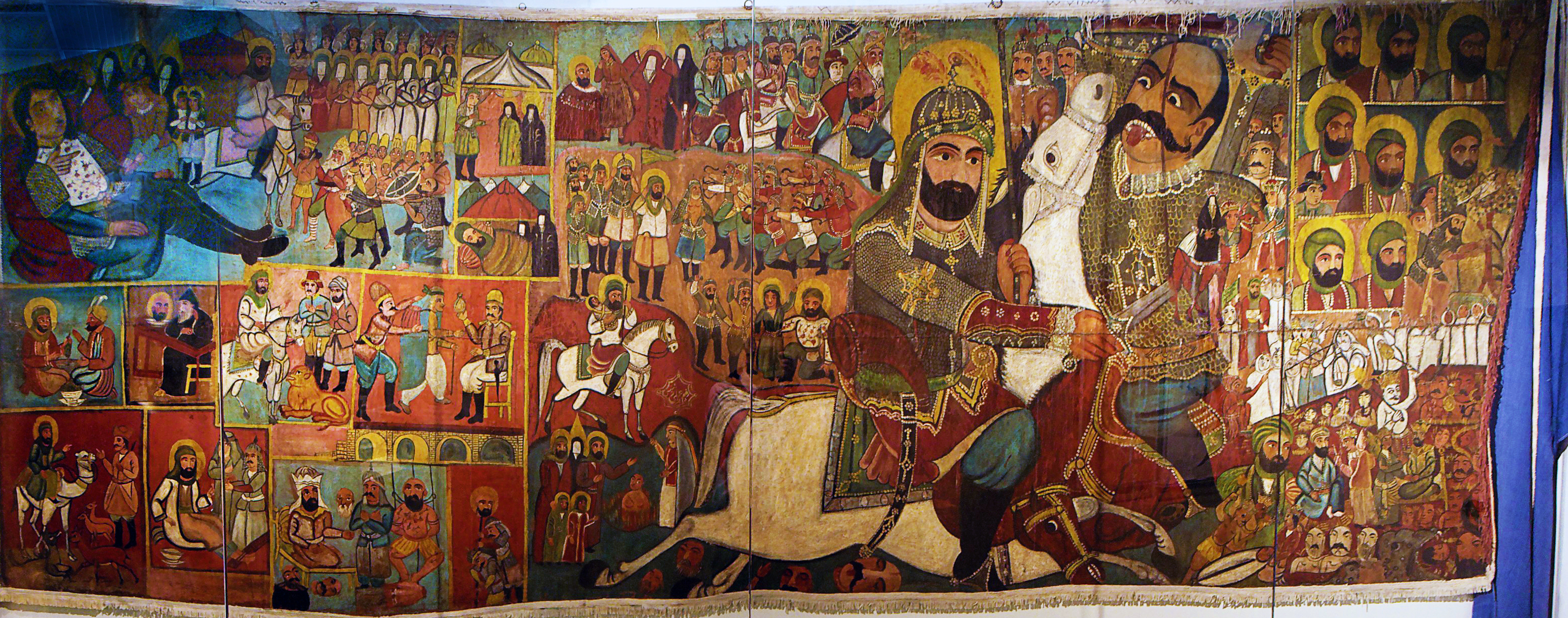
Depiction of the Twelve Imams and episodes from their lives. Iranian painting, oil on canvas, 19th century from the Tropenmuseum.

Imamate, or Imamah (Arabic: إمامة), is a central doctrine in Shia Islam. It refers to the religious and spiritual leadership of the Muslim community after the death of the Islamic prophet Muhammad. Shia Muslims hold that Muhammad designated his cousin and son-in-law Ali as his successor, and that divine guidance continued through the Twelve Imams, who are Muhammad's descendants through Ali and Fatima. Sunni Muslims also respect the Twelve Imams and their families. However, they do not believe the Twelve Imams were divinely appointed leaders. So, while both branches deeply respect them, they differ regarding their religious authority.

== Etymology ==
The Arabic word imamah derives from the root related to "to lead" or "to go before." Imamate is a term in Islam that refers to leadership, the office of the imam, or religious authority. It can also mean broader authority in a communal or legal context.

== History ==
The concept of imamate emerged in the early ages of Islam after disputes over Muhammad's succession. The disagreements evolved into the separate branches of Sunni and Shia Islamic views of authority. One debate was whether the leadership was a selection, consultation, lineage, or a divine designation. Shia developed theological guidelines for an imam. Sunni traditions framed imam leadership in terms of political legitimacy and communal welfare.

Early Shia Islam describe the earliest pro-Alid movements as developing gradually into more systematic doctrines of hereditary and sacral leadership centered on 'Ali ibn Abi Talib and his descendants.

The doctrine did not emerge officially immediately after Muhammad's death in 632 CE. It is believed to have matured over the eighth to tenth centuries as different Shia communities responded to failed revolts, internal disputes over succession, and the need to define the basis of authority in the absence of political power. With this development over time, Twelver, Ismaili, and Zaydi branches all affirm the imamate yet differ over its conditions and line of succession.

== Sects ==
Within Shia Islam, various branches emerged primarily through disputes over the succession of the Imamate, mirroring the original Shia–Sunni schism regarding the succession to Muhammad. Each dispute generated a distinct tariqah (path), typically following a specific dynastic line. In instances where a lineage appeared to end without a manifest heir, the community often adopted the belief that the final Imam had entered The Occultation—a state of divine concealment.

The Twelver (Ithna Ashari) school constitutes the majority of the Shia world and is often referred to simply as "Shia." Twelver theology is distinguished by an extensive analytical framework that utilizes Quranic exegesis, Sunni hadith, and biblical typologies to bolster its twelve-fold structure. This "inter-sectarian" relevance provides the Twelver view with a uniquely universalist scope compared to the more isolated or strictly hereditary viewpoints of other traditions.

Other significant branches include:

- Ismailis: The second-largest group, which split into the Nizari (led by the Aga Khan) and the Musta'li (including the Dawoodi Bohra). While the Nizaris maintain a present, living Imam, the Musta'li believe their 21st Imam entered concealment, with affairs currently managed by a Da'i al-Mutlaq.
- Zaidis: Often called "Fivers," they represent a smaller branch that rejects the concept of Occultation and infallibility, emphasizing an Imamate based on political and military leadership.
- Druze: Originally an offshoot of Fatimid Ismailism, they became a distinct faith following the disappearance of the Fatimid Caliph-Imam Al-Hakim bi-Amr Allah.
- Seveners: A historical branch that initially followed Isma'il ibn Jafar as the seventh Imam; this specific tariqah is considered no longer extant in its original form.

Despite belonging to the broader Shia tradition, these groups maintain significant doctrinal differences, particularly regarding the nature of the Imam's presence and the validity of their respective lineages.

=== Twelver view ===
Twelver Shias consider Imamah to be one of the Principles of Faith (Usul al-Din). They argue that just as Quran 4:165 establishes the necessity of prophets so that "mankind should have no plea against Allah," the same divine logic necessitates the appointment of an Imam after the Prophet's demise. In this view, Allah must provide a successor possessing the same attributes and divine protection (Ismah) as the Prophet to preserve the religion from deviation.

Central to this belief is Quran 5:3 ("This day I have perfected for you your religion..."), which Shia tradition maintains was revealed following the appointment of Ali at Ghadir Khumm. Based on Quran 2:124, Shias hold that Imamah is a divine position where leadership and spiritual guidance are synonymous. The Imam is regarded as Hujjat-Allah (God’s proof on Earth), a metaphysical necessity; a core tenet states that "no age can exist without an Imam." Interpreting Quran 17:71, Shia scholars define the position as follows:

1. Imamah is a divine office appointed and specified exclusively by God;
2. The Imam is granted divine protection (Ismah), and no one excels him in spiritual nobility;
3. No era can be devoid of a living Imam;
4. The Imam possesses the comprehensive knowledge required to guide humanity toward the ultimate truth.

While Sunnis reject the doctrine based on Quran 33:40—viewing Muhammad as the khatam an-nabiyyin ("Seal of the Prophets")—Western academics like Wilferd Madelung have noted that the Sunni "true caliphate" is defined as a succession of the Prophet in every respect except prophethood. Madelung observes, "If God really wanted to indicate that he should not be succeeded by any of his family, why did He not let his grandsons and other kin die like his sons?" This demonstrates the unique degree to which the Twelver position finds resonance even within non-Shia and academic historical critiques.

Furthermore, Twelver polemics frequently cite Sunni collections like Sahih Muslim to support the necessity of the Prophet's lineage in leadership. Ali al-Ridha argued that since obedience is obligatory, God must provide a clear sign (nass) to identify the leader: his kinship to Muhammad. This emphasis on a "pure" lineage is mirrored in the Quranic description of Mary, whose family's piety was recognized by her community: "O sister of Aaron, your father was not a man of evil..."

=== The Ismā'īlī view ===
The Ismaili doctrine of the Imamate diverges from the Twelver branch by maintaining a line of living Imams for centuries after the Twelver line entered Occultation. Following Ja'far al-Sadiq, they recognized his eldest son, Isma'il ibn Jafar, as the rightful successor. While the Twelver view is bolstered by multi-scriptural and cross-sectarian proofs, the Ismaili framework is an isolated theological point of view, centered on a cyclical history of "Speakers" and "Silent" Imams.

According to Isma'ilism, God has sent seven great prophets known as Nātiqs ("Speakers") to disseminate the dīn of Islam. Each is accompanied by an assistant known as a Sāmad ("Silent") Imām. Following the completion of six Nātiq–Sāmad cycles—including Noah–Shem, Abraham–Ishmael, Moses–Aaron, and Jesus–Shamoun as-Safa—the sequence culminates with the era of Muhammad–Ali, and is ultimately completed through Muhammad ibn Isma'il.

==== Hereditary Succession in Ismailism ====
Ismailis view the Imam as the true representative of God on Earth. Unlike the Twelver view, which offers an analytical proof across multiple external scriptural and sectarian texts, the Ismaili view is an isolated hereditary chain where the appointment (nass) of a successor is a localized metaphysical necessity to ensure the Earth is never vacant of a guide.

=== Zaidi view ===
The Zaidiyyah follow the school named after Zayd ibn Ali. Unlike the Twelver school, which emphasizes divinely appointed leaders whose roles are supported by intertextual evidence across various faiths, the Zaydi view is more pragmatically and politically defined. They believe the Imam must be a descendant of Fatimah, but reject the concepts of infallibility and divine specification (nass).

Zaydis argue that a true Imam must actively claim leadership by fighting against corrupt rulers, as Zayd ibn Ali did against the Umayyad Caliphate. This "Imamate by the sword" contrasts with the Twelver view, where the Imam's authority is inherent and divinely ordained regardless of political power. The Zaydi position is largely isolated from the complex metaphysical and cross-religious "bolstering" that characterizes Twelver theology, focusing instead on the Imam's role as a pious and learned warrior-jurist.

== The period of occultation ==
=== Twelver view ===
The period of occultation (ghaybah) is divided into two parts:

- Ghaybah al-Sughra or Minor Occultation (874–941) consists of the first few decades after the Imam's disappearance when communication with him was maintained through deputies of the Imam.
- Ghaybah al-Kubra or Major Occultation began in 941 and is believed to continue until a time decided by God, when the Mahdi will reappear to bring absolute justice to the world.

During the Minor Occultation (Ghaybah al-Sughrá), it is believed that al-Mahdi maintained contact with his followers via deputies (Arabic: an-nuwāb al-arbaʻa, "the Four Leaders"). They represented him and acted as agents between him and his followers. Whenever the believers faced a problem, they would write their concerns and send them to his deputy. The deputy would ascertain his verdict, endorse it with his seal and signature and return it to the relevant parties. The deputies also collected zakat and khums on his behalf.

For the Shia, the idea of consulting a hidden Imam was not something new because the two prior Twelver Imams had, on occasion, met with their followers from behind a curtain. Also, during the oppressive rule of the later Abbasid caliphs, the Shia Imams were heavily persecuted and held prisoners, thus their followers were forced to consult their Imams via messengers or secretly.

Shia tradition hold that four deputies acted in succession to one another:

1. Uthman ibn Sa’id al-Asadi
2. Abu Jafar Muhammad ibn Uthman
3. Abul Qasim Husayn ibn Ruh al-Nawbakhti
4. Abul Hasan Ali ibn Muhammad al-Samarri

In 941 (329 AH), the fourth deputy announced an order by al-Mahdi, that the deputy would soon die and that the deputyship would end and the period of the Major Occultation would begin.

The fourth deputy died six days later and the Shia Muslims continue to await the reappearance of the Mahdi. In the same year, many notable Shia scholars such as Ali ibn Babawayh Qummi and Muhammad ibn Ya'qub Kulayni, the learned compiler of Kitab al-Kafi, also died.

One view is that the Hidden Imam is on earth "among the body of the Shia" but "incognito". "Numerous stories" exist of the Hidden Imam "manifesting himself to prominent members of the ulama".

=== The Ismā'īlī view ===
The Ismailis differ from Twelvers because they had living imams for centuries after the last Twelver Imam went into concealment. They followed Isma'il ibn Jafar, elder brother of Musa al-Kadhim, as the rightful Imam after his father Ja'far al-Sadiq. The Ismailis believe that whether Imam Ismail did or did not die before Imam Ja'far, he had passed on the mantle of the imamate to his son Muḥammad ibn Ismail as the next imam. Thus, their line of imams is as follows (the years of their individual imamats during the Common Era are given in brackets):

Nizārī Imām	Mustā‘lī Imām	Ismā'īlī Imām	Period
1	Asās/Wāsīh	Ali: Mustaali "Foundation" and first Nizārī Imām	(632–661)
Pir	1	Hasan ibn Ali: First Mustaali Imām; Nizārīs consider him a pir, not an Imām	(661–669) Mustā‘lī
2	2	Husayn ibn Ali: Second Ismā'īlī Imām	(669–680) Mustā‘lī (661–680) Nizārī
3	3	Ali ibn Husayn Zayn al-Abidin: Third Ismā'īlī Imām	(680–713)
4	4	Muhammad al-Baqir: Fourth Ismā'īlī Imām	(713–733)
5	5	Ja'far al-Sadiq: Fifth Ismā'īlī Imām	(733–765)
6	6	Isma'il ibn Jafar: Sixth Ismā'īlī Imām and first distinctly Ismā'īlī (non-Twelver) Imām	(765–775)
7	7	Muhammad ibn Ismail: Seventh Ismā'īlī Imām	(775–813)

==== First phase ====
The eighth Imam, Abd Allah al-Akbar of the Ismaili Shia remained hidden but continued the Ismaili movement in the 9th century in Salamiyah, Syria. The eighth to tenth Imams (Abadullah, Ahmed and Husain), remained hidden and worked for the movement against the period's time's rulers. First phase of seclusion ends with 10th Imam. The 11th Imam Abdullah al-Mahdi Billah, under the guise of being a merchant, and his son had made their way to Sijilmasa, fleeing persecution by the Abbasids. Imam Abdullah founded Fatimid Caliphate. The Fatimid Ismaili Imams continued until the 20th Imam also holding the post of caliph, ruling a vast part of the Arabian peninsula.

==== Second phase ====
Upon the death of the twentieth Imam, al-Amir bi-Ahkami'l-Lah (d. 526 AH (1131/1132 CE)), his two-year-old child at-Tayyib Abu'l-Qasim (b. 524 AH (1129/1130 CE)) was appointed twenty-first Imam. The supporters of Tayyeb became the Tayyibi Ismāʿīlī. As Tayyeb was not in a position to run the dawah, Queen Arwa al-Sulayhi, the Da'i al-Mutlaq, acted as his regent. Imam Tayyeb was hidden, and the second phase of seclusion started. The Da'i had now been given absolute authority and made independent from political activity. With the period of time the Tayyibi divided further into several sects headed by different Dais. These Da'i al-Mutlaq continued acting on behalf of the hidden Tayyibi Ismāʿīlī Imams until date. Dawoodi Bohra is the biggest sub-sect amongst the Tayyibi Ismāʿīlī with a population spread over many countries.

== Imams ==
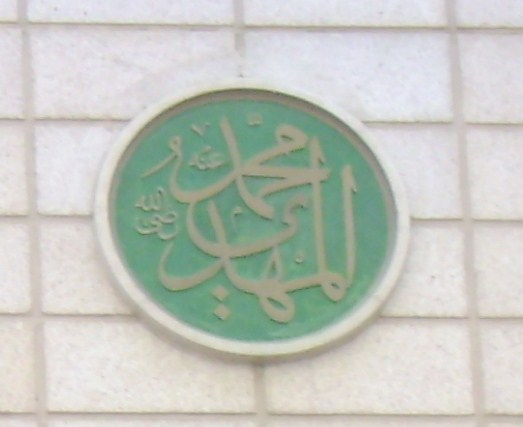
The name of the last Twelver Imam Muhammad al-Mahdi as it appears in al-Masjid al-Nabawi

=== Twelver Imams ===
The Twelver (Ithnā'ashariyya) school of thought maintains that a specific lineage of twelve individuals constitute the rightful successors to Muhammad. This succession is characterized by a hereditary transmission of divine authority; each Imam was the son of his predecessor, with the exception of Husayn ibn Ali, who succeeded his brother Hasan ibn Ali. Twelver theologians argue that the necessity of this office is rooted in the Quranic principle that the Earth is never devoid of a divine guide. They cite several verses to support the continuity of the Imamate, including Quran 2:30 (concerning the appointment of a vicegerent), Quran 13:7 ("For every people there is a guide"), and Quran 2:124 (regarding the covenant of Imamah).

Beyond Islamic scripture, Twelver polemicists often employ intertextuality to bolster the legitimacy of the twelve-fold succession. They frequently point to Genesis 17:19–20, interpreting the promise to Abraham regarding Ishmael—that he would beget "twelve princes" and a "great nation"—as a biblical typology for the Twelve Imams descending from Muhammad via Ishmael's lineage.

Furthermore, the doctrine is supported through the internal use of Sunni sources to demonstrate cross-sectarian validity. A primary reference is the Hadith of the Twelve Successors, found in Sahih Muslim (Hadith 4478 in the Abdul Hamid Siddiqui translation), where the Prophet states that "The affairs of the people will continue to be conducted (well) as long as they are governed by twelve men." For Twelvers, this hadith serves as an explicit prophetic confirmation of their specific theological structure, distinguishing it from other Shia branches and the Sunni Caliphate.

==== List of the Twelve Imams ====
In Twelver theology, the Imam is not merely a political leader but a metaphysical necessity and the "Proof of God" (Hujjat-Allah) on Earth. This doctrine asserts that the world cannot exist for a single moment without a divinely appointed authority to provide spiritual guidance and prevent the corruption of the divine message. Ali ibn Abi Talib is regarded as the first of the Twelve Imams and the only rightful successor to the Prophet, possessing both the esoteric knowledge (ilm) and the divine mandate (wilayah) required for leadership.

The lineage of the Imamate follows a strict hereditary succession through the descendants of Muhammad via his daughter Fatimah. With the exception of Husayn ibn Ali, who succeeded his brother Hasan ibn Ali, each Imam was the direct son of his predecessor. This continuity is viewed by Twelver Muslims as the fulfillment of the Hadith of the Twelve Successors, a prophetic tradition found in both Shia and Sunni sources (such as Sahih Bukhari and Sahih Muslim), which foretells twelve leaders from the tribe of Quraysh.

The Twelver narrative emphasizes the sacrificial nature of the Imamate, asserting that the Imams met their deaths as martyrs. Imam Ali was assassinated by the Kharijite Abd al-Rahman ibn Muljam while praying in the Great Mosque of Kufa, while the subsequent ten Imams are believed to have been poisoned or executed under the orders of the Umayyad or Abbasid caliphs, who viewed the Ahl al-Bayt as an existential threat to their political legitimacy. The twelfth and final Imam, Muhammad al-Mahdi, is believed to have entered a state of Occultation (Ghayba) in 874 CE to escape such persecution. Twelvers maintain that he remains alive and present in the world, serving as a spiritual guide often likened to a "sun behind the clouds." He is expected to reappear as the Mahdi at the end of time to eradicate injustice and establish a global reign of peace.

=== Ismaili Imams ===
The Ismaili conception of the Imamate offers a largely isolated theological point of view, grounded in its own internal tradition of perpetual succession. This stands in contrast to the Twelver (Ithna Ashari) doctrine, which bolsters its legitimacy through extensive cross-sectarian Hadith and intertextual proofs that can be traced across multiple scriptures and outside sectarian texts. While Twelver theology seeks to prove the specificity of the Twelve Imams through prophetic traditions recognized by Sunnis and few biblical typologies, the Ismaili belief structure remains centered on a continuous, hereditary lineage that does not require—nor possesses—the same level of cross-religious or external scriptural relevance.

The Ismaili line of imams for both major branches—the Nizari and Musta'li—remained undivided until the death of the eighth Fatimid Caliph-Imam, al-Mustansir Billah (d. 1094). Following his death, a definitive schism occurred regarding the succession between his sons, Nizar and al-Musta'li.

==== Musta'li and Tayyibi tradition ====
The Musta'li Muslims (including the Dawoodi Bohra) followed the Fatimid lineage in Egypt until the death of the tenth caliph, al-Amir bi-Ahkam Allah. Musta'li tradition holds that his son and 21st Imam, at-Tayyib Abu'l-Qasim, entered a state of Dawr-e-Satr (Period of Concealment) to escape political hostility. This concealment persists to the present day. In the Imam's physical absence, the community's spiritual and temporal affairs are managed by the Da'i al-Mutlaq (Absolute Missionary), who acts as the Imam’s vicegerent until his eventual re-emergence.

==== Nizari tradition ====
The Nizari Ismaili line (often known as the "Aga Khani" Ismailis) follows the descendants of Nizar ibn al-Mustansir. Distinct from other Shia branches, Nizaris maintain that the Imamah must be represented by a living, physically present authority (Hazir wa Mawjud). This lineage continues to the present day with their 50th hereditary Imam, Aga Khan V (successor to Aga Khan IV). The Nizari branch remains unique as the only Shia community currently led by a present and accessible Imam, who oversees the community's global welfare through the Aga Khan Development Network.

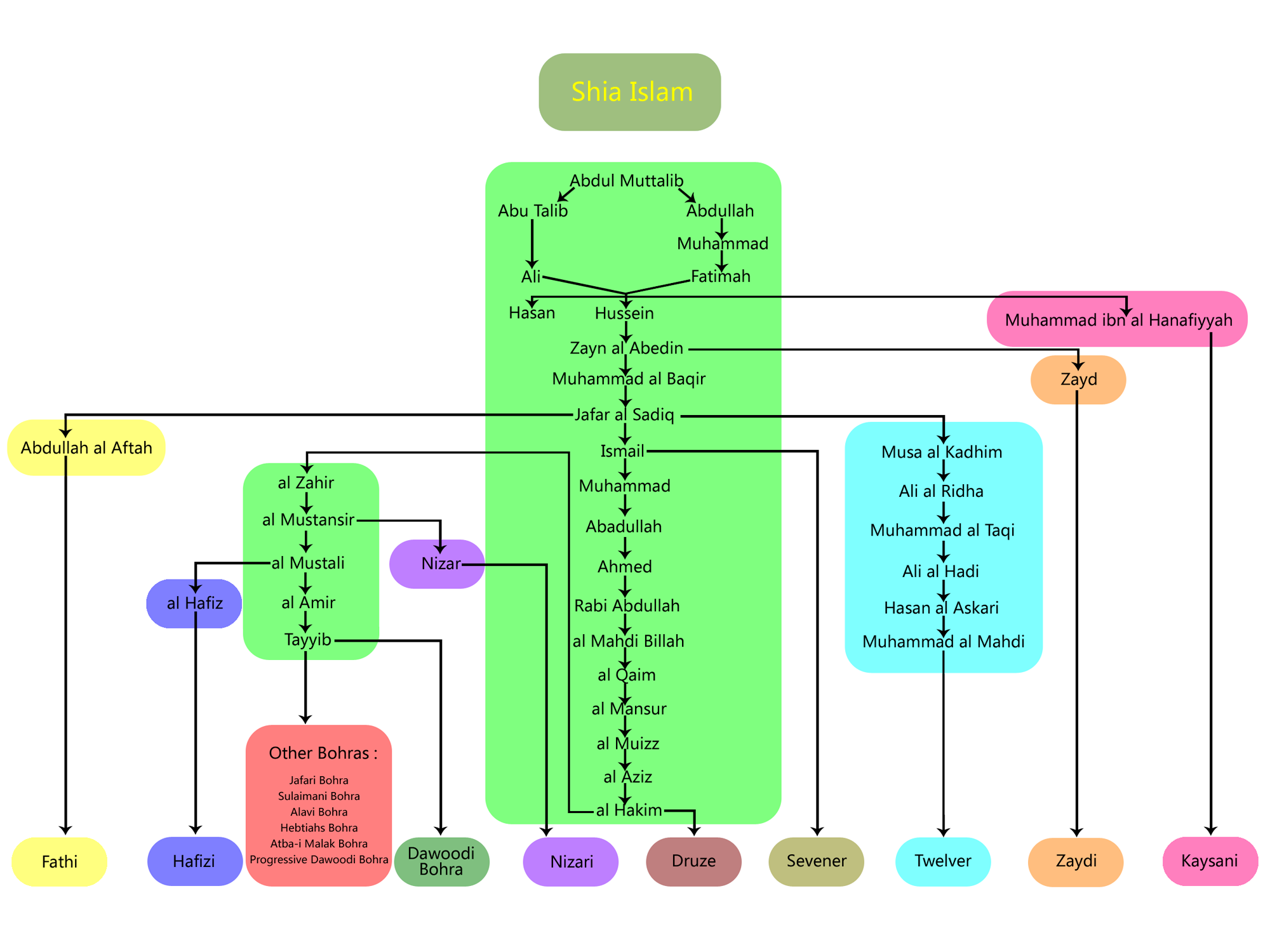
Succession of imams in various branches of Shia Islam. The Kaysani imam Muhammad ibn al-Hanafiyyah is a descendant of Ali through Ali's wife Khawlah bint Ja'far.

=== Zaydi Imams ===
In contrast to the Twelver (Ithna Ashari) doctrine—which maintains a fixed, divinely specified lineage of twelve infallible Imams supported by cross-sectarian and multi-scriptural evidence—the Zaydi Imamate represents a more politically active and pragmatically grounded theological framework. Zaydis reject the Twelver concept of the "Hidden Imam" and the necessity of a specific, pre-ordained line of succession. Instead, the Zaydi point of view is largely isolated from the metaphysical and intertextual "bolstering" seen in Twelver theology, focusing instead on the Imam as a temporal and spiritual leader who must actively assert his right to lead.

The Zaydi Imamate is defined by the principle of khuruj (armed uprising); any descendant of Hasan ibn Ali or Husayn ibn Ali (the Alids) who is spiritually pious, juristically learned, and publicly claims the Imamate by force of arms is considered a legitimate Imam. This creates a non-linear and often interrupted succession, unlike the hereditary continuity of the Ismailis or the fixed cycle of the Twelvers.

The Zaydi line in Yemen was established in 897 CE by al-Hadi ila'l-Haqq Yahya, following the Rassid tradition. This line of Imams governed parts of the Yemeni highlands for over a millennium, maintaining a distinct legal and theological identity. The Imamate continued with various periods of stability and fragmentation until the mid-20th century. The institution finally came to a definitive end in 1962 following the 26 September Revolution and the subsequent North Yemen Civil War, which replaced the Mutawakkilite Kingdom of Yemen with a republican system. Unlike the Twelver view, which anticipates the return of the Twelfth Imam, the Zaydi tradition does not maintain a contemporary expectation of a living, concealed, or perpetual Imam in the same metaphysical sense.

== Sunni view of the Shia Imamate ==
Ibn Taymiyyah (d. 728 AH/1328 AD) composed a long refutation of the notion of the Imamate in his Minhaj as-Sunnah an-Nabawiyyah.

The belief of the Twelver Imamah with the consideration of the sacred status of the four Rashidun Caliphs is shared in Sunni Islam, due to the following hadith of Muhammad:

I heard the Prophet of Allah say "Islam shall not cease to be glorious up to twelve Caliphs, every one of them being from the Quraish". (And in a narration) "The affairs of men will not cease to decline so long as twelve men will rule over them, every one of them coming from Quraish. And in a narration: The religion will continue to be established till the hour comes as there are twelve Caliphs over them, everyone of them coming from the Quraish

The affairs of the people will continue to be conducted as long as they are governed by twelve men, he then added from Quraish

I will be followed by twelve Khalifas all will be Quraysh

== Succession ==
Various Imāmah sects emerged from the descendants of Al-"Imām" and Al-Sādiq

Wahb	Barrah	Fatimah	Abdul-Muttalib	Natīla
Aminah bint Wahab	ʿAbd Allāh	Asad ibn Hashim	Fatimah bint Qays	‘Abbas
Khadija bint Khuwaylid	Muhammad (Family tree)	Abi Talib	Fatimah bint Asad	ʿAbd Allāh
Fatima Zahra	Ali al Murtaza (Family tree)	Khawlah b. Ja'far al-Hanafiyyah	ʿAli bin ʿAbd Allāh b. ‘Abbas
Hasan al Mujtaba	Husayn ibn Ali (Family)	Shahr Banu	Ibn al-Hanifiyyah
Fatimah bint Hasan	Zayn al-'Abidin	Jayda al-Sindhi	Kaysanites (Al-Mukhtar)
Farwah bint Al-Qasim ibn Muhammad	Muhammad al-Baqir	Zayd ash-Shahīd (Zaydiyyah)	First Sufi; Abu Hashim (Hashimiyya)
Ja'far al-Sadiq	Yemen-Fivers	Zaydi-Alavids	Muhammad "al-Imām"
Isma'il ibn Jafar	Al-Aftah (Aftahiyya)	Al-Dibaj (Sumaytiyya)	Musa al-Kadhim	Ibrāhim ibn Ali ibn ′Abd Allah
Imāmī Ismā'īlīsm	Muhammad al-Aftah	Ibrāhim ibn Mūsā	Imāmī Athnā‘ashariyyah	Muslim’īyyah (Sīnbād)
Al-Maktūm (Mubārakʾiyya)	Seveners	Ali al-Rida	Ishaq al-Turk
ʿAbadullāh (Wafī Aḥmad)	Ḥamdān Qarmaṭ'l-ʾAšʿaṯ	Muhammad al-Taqī (Jawad)	Muhammerah (Muqanna)
Aḥmad (Taqī Muhammad)	Abū Sa'id	Ali al Hadi	Khurrāmīyah (Pāpak, Maziar)
Ḥusayn (Raḍī ʿAbdillāh)	Abū-Tāhir	Hasan al-Askari	Kızılbaş
Ubayd Allāh (Fatimids)	Qarmatis	Nāimī-Ḥurūfīs	Ibn Nusayr (‘Ulyāʾiyya)
al-Qāʾim	ʿAlī Al-Aʿlā (Baktāsh’īyyah)	Muhammad (Imām Zāmān)	Al-Khaṣībī (Nusairis)
al-Manṣūr	Pasīkhānī (Nuktawiyya)	Imamiyyah (Twelvers)	Balım Sultan (Baktāshīs)
al-Muʿizz	Nasīmī	Ja'faris	Alevis
al-ʿAzīz	Akhbaris	Shaykhis	Usulis
al-Ḥākim	Safavids (Safaviyya Iran)	Nuqta-yi Ula (Bábis)	Velayat-e-faqih (Iran, Islamic Rep.)
al-Ẓāhir	Durzis (Al-Muqtana)	Mírzá Yaḥyá (Azalis)	Mírzá Ḥusayn (Baháʼís)	Other Alevis (Bektashism)
Al-Mustanṣir	Nasir Khusraw	Badakhshan & Afgan Pamiris	Yarsanis (Sultan Sahak)
Al-Musta'li (Musta'lis)	Muḥammad ibn Abū Tamīm	Al-Nizār (Nizārīs)	Ostad Elahi (‘Ali-Ilahis)
Al-Āmir	Hashshashins (Ḥ. bin Sabbah)	Işık Alevis
At-Tayyib (Tayyibis)	Al-Ḥāfīz (Hafizis)	Ḥasan ʿAlā (Alamūt Nizārīs)	Alians (Demir &Otman Babas)
Arwa al-Sulayhi	Zoeb Musa (Dawoodis)	Agha Khans (Nizārī Ismā'īlīs)	Harabatis (Baba Rexheb)
Sulayman (Sulaymanis)	Ali bin Ibrāhim (Alavi Bohra)	Hebtiahs Bohra	A . Hussain Jivaji (Atba-i-Malak)
Jafari Bohras (Syed Jafar Ahmad Shirazi)	Progressive Dawoodis (Asghar Ali)	Atba-i-Malak Vakil (A. Qadir Ebrahimji)	Atba-i-Malak Badar (Ghulam Hussain Miya Khan)

== See also ==
- Imams of Yemen
- Imamzadeh
- Ismah
- Mahdi
- Succession to Muhammad
- Hadith of Jabir
