= Ahmad al-Wafi =

Eighth Isma'ili Imam (766–828)

Ahmad al-Wafi الوافي أَحْمَد Eighth Imam of Isma'ilism

8th Isma'ili Imam
- In office 813–828
- Preceded by: Muhammad ibn Isma'il
- Succeeded by: Muhammad al-Taqi
- Title: al-Wafi(lit. 'true to one's word') al-Radi (lit. 'the satisfied one')

Personal life
- Born: 149 AH (approximately 765/766) Salamiyah
- Died: 212 AH (approximately 827/828) Salamiyah
- Resting place: Salamiyah, Syria
- Children: List of children: Muhammad al-Taqi; Ali al-Layth; Ibrahim; Fatima
- Parents: Muhammad ibn Isma'il (father); Fatima bint al-Husayn (mother)
- Other name: ʿAbd Allāh ibn Muḥammad

Religious life
- Religion: Shia Islam

Abū Aḥmad ʿAbd Allāh ibn Muḥammad ibn Ismāʿīl (Arabic: أَبُو أَحْمَد عَبْد ٱللَّٰه ٱبْن مُحَمَّد ٱبْن إسْماعِيل, c. 766 – 828), was a descendant of the Islamic prophet Muhammad and the eight of the Isma'ili Imams, succeeding his father, Muhammad ibn Isma'il (d. 813). Abd Allah traveled throughout Persia and the Middle East. At an unknown date, in the first half of the 3rd/9th century, he found refuge in Syria, where he eventually re-established contact with some of his da'is, and settled in Salamiyah, continuing to pose as a Hashimite merchant. Abd Allah did not reveal his true identity publicly and only a few high ranking Isma'ili hujjats and da'is were aware of his whereabouts. He is known by the epithets al-Wāfī (lit. 'true to one's word') and al-Raḍī (lit. 'the satisfied one'). Abd Allah designated his son Ahmad as his successor and died around 828.

With the death of Ja'far al-Sadiq in 148/765, Isma'il (d. 158/775) and Muhammad (d. 197/813), the gravity of persecutions of the Abbasids had considerably increased. The Isma'ili Imams were impelled to thicken their hiding, therefore, the first dawr al-satr came into force from 197/813 to 268/882, wherein the Imams were known as al-a'imma al-masturin (lit. 'the concealed Imams'). The concealment ended with the establishment of the Fatimid caliphate (r. 909–1171).

== Historical background ==
With the death of Ja'far al-Sadiq in 148/765, Isma'il (d. 158/775) and Muhammad (d. 197/813), the gravity of persecutions of the Abbasids had considerably increased. The Isma'ili Imams were impelled to thicken their hiding, therefore, the first dawr al-satr ('period of concealment') (Note: The idea of being hidden (mastur) must no, however, be confused with the 'occultation' of the twelfth Imam of the Twelvers. The first implies simply being hidden from the eyes of the crowd and from public notice, while the second means disappearance from the physical world.) came into force from 197/813 to 268/882, wherein the Imams were known as al-a'imma al-masturin (lit. 'the concealed Imams'). During this time, the living Imam's identity was hidden for protection and the community continued to operate under the authority of Muhammad ibn Isma'il. According to later tradition, these were Abd Allah (the 8th Imam), Ahmad (the 9th Imam) and al-Husayn (the 10th Imam). Among the later Isma'ili historians, Ahmad ibn Ibrahim al-Naysaburi, the author of Istitār al-Imām, compiled under the Fatimid Imam–Caliph al-Aziz Billah (r. 975–995) seems first to have mentioned the names of the three 'hidden' Imams.

Modern historian of the Fatimid period, Shainool Jiwa, explains that during dawr al-satr (765–909 CE) Isma'ili doctrine had spread as far as from Yemen to Ifriqiya (modern-day Tunisia and eastern Algeria), with its most prominent adherents being the Kutama Berbers of North Africa.

== Life ==
Abd Allah, the future Ahmad al-Wafi, was born in 149/766. His father was Muhammad ibn Isma'il, a descendant of Ali ibn Abi Talib and Fatima, who were the cousin and daughter of the Islamic prophet Muhammad, respectively. Abd Allah's mother was Fatima, the daughter of Sarah, sister of Ishaq ibn al-Abbas. When Muhammad ibn Isma'il was about to die, he handed over the earth to his son, Abd Allah, making him his successor and trustee.

The Abbasid Caliphate made renewed efforts to kill or poison every Husaynid Sayyid. In order to escape Abbasid persecution, Abd Allah, sought refuge in different parts of Persia and did not reveal his identity and place of residence except to a few trusted associates; he settled in Askar Mukram near Ahwaz, in the province of Khuzestan, whence he later fled to Basra and then to Salamiyah in central Syria, where he built a house and resided in the cloak of a local merchant. There lived many eminent Hashimites in Salamiyah; most of them belonged to the posterity of Aqil ibn Abi Talib, but some of whom were related to the Abbasids. Abd Allah pretended to be of their number—and succeeded in keeping alive. The efforts of Abd Allah, began to bear fruit in the 260s/870s, when numerous da'is appeared in Iraq and adjacent regions.

Abd Allah further on repaired to Daylam with his 32 trusted da'is, where he got married with an Alid in the village of Ashnash, and had a son by her, whom he named Ahmad, who later on became known as Muhammad al-Taqi. Abd Allah had another son besides Ahmad, Ibrahim. Nothing is virtually known about Ibrahim, save the fact that his posterity was still living at the time of the Fatimid Imam–Caliph Abd Allah al-Mahdi Billah in Salamiyah and were slain by the Qarmatians in 290/902. Before dying in about 212/827–828, Abd Allah had designated his son Ahmad as his successor.

House and Mausoleum of Abd Allah, Salamiyah

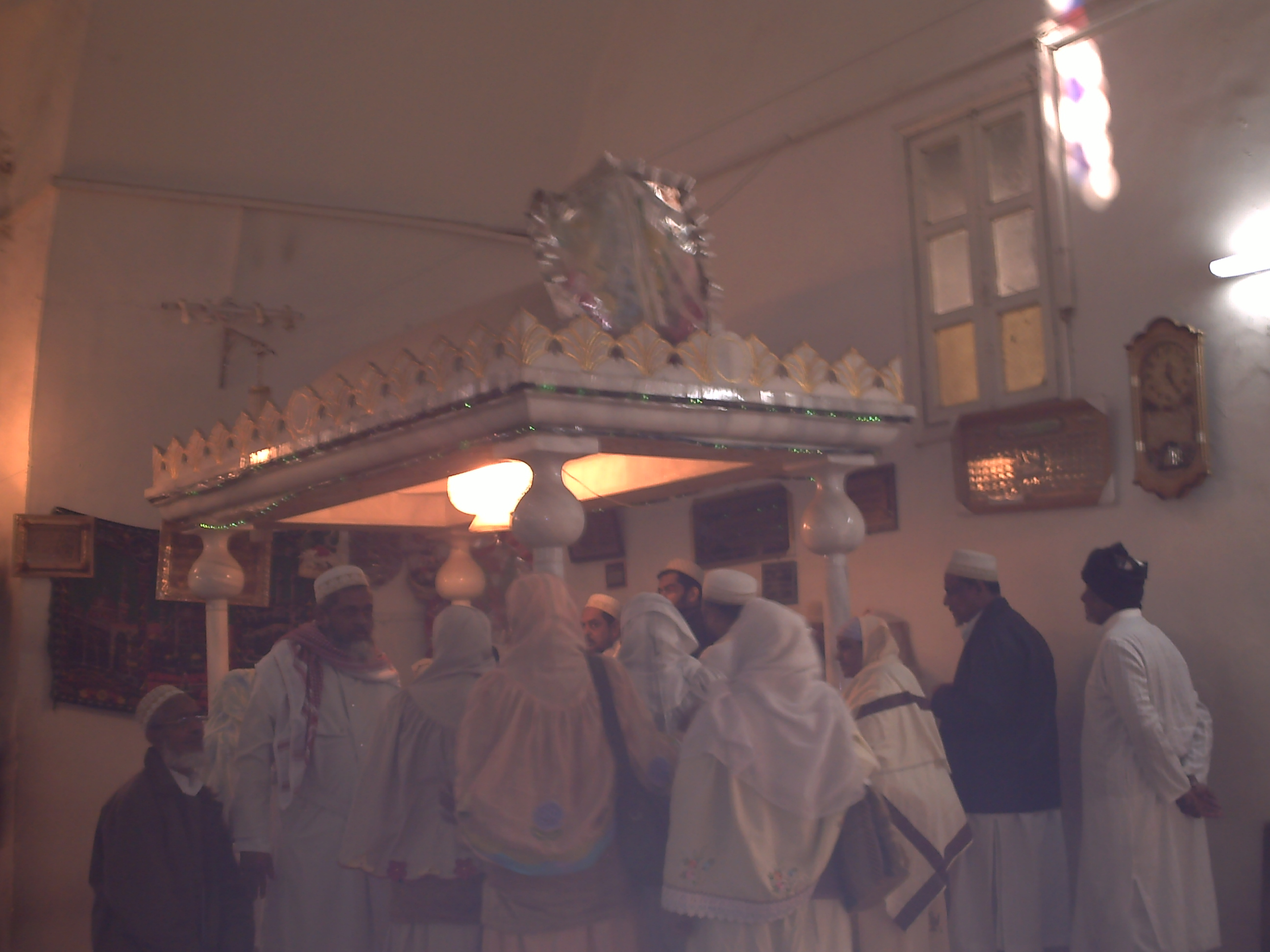
"Qabr Mubarak" Imam Abd Allah, Salamiyah

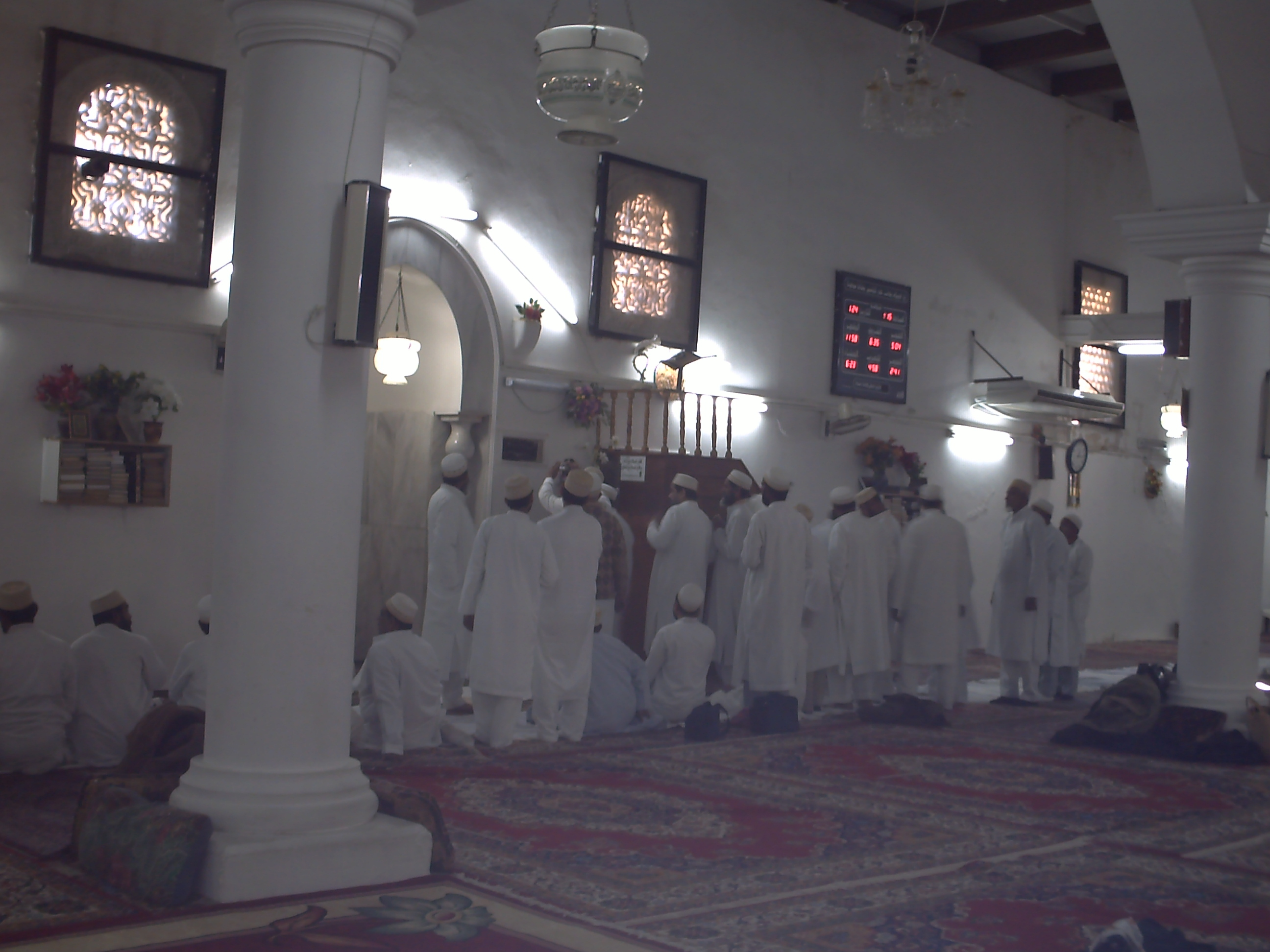
Mosque of Imam Abd Allah, Salamiyah, Syria, renovated by the Dawoodi Bohras

== See also ==
- Family tree of Muhammad
- List of Isma'ili imams
- Imamate in Nizari doctrine

== Sources ==
- Daftary, Farhad (2007). The Ismāʿı̄lı̄s: Their History and Doctrines (Second ed.). Cambridge: Cambridge University Press. ISBN 978-0-521-61636-2.
- Tajddin, Mumtaz Ali (1997). Ismailis Through History (PDF). Karachi: Islamic book publisher.
- Tajddin, Mumtaz Ali (2009). Brief history of the Shia Ismaili Imams. Karachi.
- Ivanow, Vladimir (1942). Ismaili Tradition Concerning the Rise of the Fatimids. Islamic Research Association. OCLC 675496.
- Hollister, John Norman (1953). The Shi'a of India. Luzac. ISBN 978-8170691068.
- Daftary, Farhad (2013). A History of Shi'i Islam. I.B. Tauris. ISBN 9780755608669.
- Makarem, Sami Nasib (1969). The Hidden Imams of the Ismailis. al-Abhath.
- Jiwa, Shainool (2018). The Fatimids. 1. The Rise of a Muslim Empire. London and New York: I.B. Tauris. ISBN 978-1-78453-935-1.
- Daftary, Farhad (1998). A short history of the Ismailis. Edinburgh University Press. ISBN 978-0-7486-0687-0.
- Nasr, Seyyed Hossein (1966). Ideals and Realities of Islam. Praeger.

Ahmad al-Wafi of the Ahl al-Bayt Banu Hashim Clan of the Quraysh Born: 149 AH ≈ 766 AD Died: 212 AH ≈ 828 AD
Shia Islam titles
Preceded by Muhammad ibn Ismāʿīl al-Shākir	8th Imam of Isma'ilism	Succeeded by Ahmad (al-Taqī Muhammad)
