= Abd Allah al-Radi =

Tenth Isma'ili Imam (825–881)

Abd Allah al-Radi Tenth Imam of Isma'ilism
- عَبْد ٱللَّٰه الرَّضِيِّ

10th Isma'ili Imam
- In office 840–881
- Preceded by: Muhammad al-Taqi
- Succeeded by: Abd Allah al-Mahdi Billah
- Title: al-Radi (lit. 'the satisfied one'); al-Zaki (lit. 'the pious one'); al-Muqtada al-Hadi(lit. 'whose example should be followed, and guiding')

Personal life
- Born: c. 825 Salamiyah
- Died: 881 Salamiyah
- Resting place: Salamiyah, Syria
- Children: Abd Allah al-Mahdi Billah
- Parent: Muhammad al-Taqi (father)
- Other name: al-Ḥusayn ibn Aḥmad

Religious life
- Religion: Shia Ismaili

Abu ʿAlī al-Ḥusayn ibn Aḥmad ibn ʿAbd Allāh ibn Muḥammad ibn Ismāʿīl (Arabic: ابو علي الحسين بن أحمد ٱبْن عَبْد ٱللَّٰه ٱبْن مُحَمَّد ٱبْن إسْماعِيل, c. 825 – 881), also known as al-Zakī (lit. 'the pure'), al-Raḍī (lit. 'the satisfied one') and al-Muqtadā al-Hādī (lit. 'whose example should be followed, and guiding'), was a descendant of the Islamic prophet Muhammad and the tenth of the Isma'ili Imams, succeeding his father, Muhammad al-Taqi (d. 840). Before his death in 881, he entrusted the care of his son and successor, Abd Allah al-Mahdi who was then around 8 years old to his full brother, Sa'id al-Khayr, also known as Abu'l-Shalaghlagh.

== Historical background ==
With the death of Ja'far al-Sadiq in 765, Isma'il (d. 775) and Muhammad (d. 813), the gravity of the persecution of Isma'ili Imams and their supporters by the Abbasids had considerably increased. The Isma'ili Imams were compelled to hide, therefore, the first dawr al-satr ('period of concealment') (Note: The idea of being hidden (mastur) must no, however, be confused with the 'occultation' of the twelfth Imam of the Twelvers. The first implies simply being hidden from the eyes of the crowd and from public notice, while the second means disappearance from the physical world.) came into force from 765 to 909. During this period, the Imams were known as al-a'imma al-masturin (lit. 'the concealed Imams'). The Imam's identity was hidden to protect the Imam from being persecuted by the Abbasids and the community continued to operate under the authority of Muhammad ibn Isma'il. According to later tradition, these Imams were Abd Allah (the 8th Imam), Ahmad (the 9th Imam) and al-Husayn (the 10th Imam). Among the later Isma'ili historians, Ahmad ibn Ibrahim al-Naysaburi, the author of Istitār al-Imām, compiled under the Fatimid Imam, Caliph al-Aziz Billah (r. 975–995), seems to be first historian to mention the names of the three 'hidden' Imams.

A modern historian of the Fatimid period, Shainool Jiwa, explains that during dawr al-satr Ismaili doctrine had spread as far as from Yemen to Ifriqiya (modern-day Tunisia and eastern Algeria), with its most prominent adherents being the Kutama Berbers of North Africa.

== Life ==
Husayn ibn Ahmad was born in 825 and assumed the Imamate in 840. His hujjat was Ahmad, surnamed al-Hakim, a descendant of Husayn ibn Ali, to whom Abd Allah ibn Maymun al-Qaddah handed over his position. Al-Radi's home was in Salamiyah, where he lived among the Hashimites and acted as if he was one of them. He gave presents to the local governors and was lavish with hospitality. He is said to have granted allowances from his wealth to the poor and disabled persons in Salamiyah without discrimination between the Isma'ilis and non-Isma'ilis. His father Muhammad al-Taqi is remembered for his Encyclopedia of the Brethren of Purity (Rasāʿil Ikhwān al-ṣafā), which his son is said to have summarised in his Jāmiʿat al-Jāmiʿa. Al-Radi is remembered for his daʿwah or proselytising .

He organised the propaganda, spread it further afield, broadcast instruction to his followers, making it manifest; he established proofs, explained the risalas (apparently the Encyclopedia of the Ikhwān al-ṣafā') and despatched his da'is everywhere. He thus made the true religion visible to those who were in search of it.

— Idris Imad al-Din, ʿUyūn al-Akhbār

Al-Radi travelled to Kufa, on pilgrimage to the tombs of Ali ibn Abi Talib and his son, Husayn. While there he met Abu al-Qasim ibn Hasan ibn Farah ibn Hawshab, who was of the Twelvers and was associated with Hasan al-Askari. He also met Ali ibn al-Fadl al-Jayshani. He sent both men to Yemen to establish the way of the Isma'iliyya there. They reached Yemen, and conquered Sanaa, the capital of Yemen, and exiled the ruling tribe of Banu Laydir, and established Isma'ili authority in Yemen.

Al-Radi died in 881 at Salamiyah while he was travelling in the vicinity. Before his death he appointed as his trustee his brother, Sa'id al-Khayr, also known as Abu'l-Shalaghlagh. He also made Abu'l-Shalaghlagh the guardian of his son, al-Mahdi. It is stated in the Istitār al-Imām that the guardian, Abu'l-Shalaghlagh, the 'acting Imam', tried to usurp the Imamate for his own line, appointing one after another his sons successively as his heir, but that all of his sons died.

== See also ==
- Family tree of Muhammad
- List of Isma'ili imams
- Imamate in Nizari doctrine

== Sources ==
- Daftary, Farhad (2007). The Ismāʿı̄lı̄s: Their History and Doctrines (Second ed.). Cambridge: Cambridge University Press. ISBN 978-0-521-61636-2.
- Tajddin, Mumtaz Ali (1997). Ismailis Through History (PDF). Karachi: Islamic book publisher.
- Tajddin, Mumtaz Ali (2009). Brief history of the Shia Ismaili Imams. Karachi.
- Ivanow, Vladimir (1942). Ismaili Tradition Concerning the Rise of the Fatimids. Islamic Research Association. OCLC 675496.
- Hollister, John Norman (1953). The Shi'a of India. Luzac. ISBN 978-8170691068.
- Makarem, Sami Nasib (1969). The Hidden Imams of the Ismailis. al-Abhath.
- Jiwa, Shainool (2018). The Fatimids. 1. The Rise of a Muslim Empire. London and New York: I.B. Tauris. ISBN 978-1-78453-935-1.
- Daftary, Farhad (1998). A short history of the Ismailis. Edinburgh University Press. ISBN 978-0-7486-0687-0.
- Nasr, Seyyed Hossein (1966). Ideals and Realities of Islam. Praeger.

Abd Allah al-Radi of the Ahl al-Bayt Banu Hashim Clan of the Quraysh Born: 210 AH ≈ 825 AD Died: 268 AH ≈ 881 AD
Shia Islam titles
Preceded by Aḥmad (al-Taqī Muhammad)	10th Imam of Isma'ilism	Succeeded by ʿAbd Allāh al-Mahdī Billāh
