= Muhammad al-Taqi =

Ninth of the Isma'ili Shia Imams (790–840)

Muhammad al-Taqi Ninth Imam of Isma'ilism
- مُحَمَّد ٱلْتَقِيّ

9th Isma'ili Imam
- In office 828–840
- Preceded by: Ahmad al-Wafi
- Succeeded by: Abd Allah al-Radi
- Title: al-Taqi (lit. 'the pious'); Sahib al-Rasa'il(lit. 'lord of the epistles')

Personal life
- Born: 149 AH (approximately 789/790) Salamiyah
- Died: 212 AH (approximately 839/840) Salamiyah
- Resting place: Salamiyah, Syria
- Children: Abd Allah al-Radi; Sa'id al-Khayr
- Parent: Ahmad al-Wafi (father)
- Other name: Aḥmad ibn ʿAbd Allāh

Religious life
- Religion: Shia Islam

Abu al-Husayn Ahmad ibn Abd Allah ibn Muhammad ibn Isma'il (Arabic: أَبُو ٱلْحُسَيْن أَحْمَد ٱبْن عَبْد ٱللَّٰه ٱبْن مُحَمَّد ٱبْن إسْماعِيل, romanized: Abū al-Ḥusayn Aḥmad ibn ʿAbd Allāh ibn Muḥammad ibn Ismāʿīl; c. 790–840), commonly known as Muhammad al-Taqi (Arabic: مُحَمَّد ٱلْتَقِيّ, romanized: Muḥammad al-Taqī, lit. 'Muhammad the Pious'), was a descendant of the Islamic prophet Muhammad and the ninth of the Isma'ili Imams, succeeding his father, Ahmad al-Wafi (d. 828). Like his father, he lived primarily in Salamiyah, and Abd Allah ibn Maymun al-Qaddah, the chief missionary (da'i), continued to serve as the hijab (lit. 'cover') for him. Known by the title Ṣāḥib al-Rasāʾil (lit. 'lord of the epistles'), al-Taqi is said to have prepared with his followers an encyclopedic text called the Encyclopedia of the Brethren of Purity (Rasāʾil Ikhwān al-Ṣafā). He died in 840 in Salamiyah and was succeeded by his son al-Husayn.

With the death of Ja'far al-Sadiq in 148/765, Isma'il (d. 158/775) and Muhammad (d. 197/813), the gravity of persecutions of the Abbasids had considerably increased. The Isma'ili Imams were impelled to thicken their hiding, therefore, the first dawr al-satr came into force from 197/813 to 268/882, wherein the Imams were known as al-a'imma al-masturin (lit. 'the concealed Imams'). The concealment ended with the establishment of the Fatimid Caliphate (r. 909–1171).

== Historical background ==
With the death of Ja'far al-Sadiq in 148/765, Isma'il (d. 158/775) and Muhammad (d. 197/813), the gravity of persecutions of the Abbasids had considerably increased. The Isma'ili Imams were impelled to thicken their hiding, therefore, the first dawr al-satr ('period of concealment') (Note: The idea of being hidden (mastur) must no, however, be confused with the 'occultation' of the twelfth Imam of the Twelvers. The first implies simply being hidden from the eyes of the crowd and from public notice, while the second means disappearance from the physical world.) came into force from 197/813 to 268/882, wherein the Imams were known as al-a'imma al-masturin (lit. 'the concealed Imams'). During this time, the living Imam's identity was hidden for protection and the community continued to operate under the authority of Muhammad ibn Isma'il. According to later tradition, these were Abd Allah (the 8th Imam), Ahmad (the 9th Imam) and al-Husayn (the 10th Imam). Among the later Isma'ili historians, Ahmad ibn Ibrahim al-Naysaburi, the author of Istitār al-Imām, compiled under the Fatimid Imam–Caliph al-Aziz Billah (r. 975–995) seems first to have mentioned the names of the three 'hidden' Imams.

Modern historian of the Fatimid period, Shainool Jiwa, explains that during dawr al-satr (765–909 CE) Isma'ili doctrine had spread as far as from Yemen to Ifriqiya (modern-day Tunisia and eastern Algeria), with its most prominent adherents being the Kutama Berbers of North Africa.

== Life ==
Ahmad ibn Abd Allah was born in 174/790. He succeeded his father as second head of the Isma'ili dawah (lit. 'mission') and, like him, lived as a merchant in Salamiyah in Syria. His hujjat was Abd Allah ibn Maymun al-Qaddah, the chief missionary (da'i), continued to serve as the hijab (lit. 'cover') for him. Al-Taqi lived, probably, at the close of the second and opening of the third century of the Muslim era. He had the reputation of being profoundly learned. Al-Taqi was known as an eminent Hashimite trader, making the people to flock at his residence. It suspected the Syrian governor, who communicated its report to the Abbasid caliph al-Ma'mun (r. 813–833), who issued order to arrest al-Taqi, but the latter had quitted Salamiyah in advance for few years. In addition to spreading his message via his da'is, al-Taqi actively engaged in the sociophilosophical concerns in his time.

According to the 10-th century Arab scholar Ibn al-Nadim (d. 995), al-Taqi sent the da'i al-Husayn al-Ahwazi to the environs (sawād) of Kufa. The latter converted Hamdan Qarmat and founded the "Qarmatian" sect of Iraq. The anti-Isma'ili writer Akhu Muhsin (d. 965) claimed that al-Taqi directed the da'i Abu Abdallah al-Shi'i to the Maghreb in 279/892–93 and thus laid the foundation for later Fatimid power there.

Sectarian literature attributes to him the publication of the Encyclopedia of the Brethren of Purity (Rasā'il Ikhwān al-ṣafā'), on account of which he is known as Ṣāḥib al-Rasāʿil (lit. 'lord of the epistles'). It is furthermore reported by some Isma'ili sources that the authorship of the Rasāʿil may even date back to the times of the Imam Ja'far al-Sadiq himself, passing by the contributions of his three Imamate hidden successors. The title represents the work as that of the "Sincere Brethren" or "Brethren of Purity", a society that flourished in Basra: debating on literature, religion, philosophy and science. In this work, pre-Islamic wisdom, such as Hellenistic philosophy and Babylonian astrology, was presented along with Isma'ili ideas. The Epistles were secretly prepared in a cave, and when sufficient numbers were produced, they were simultaneously placed in the leading mosques of the Abbasid lands. In the forty-fourth tract there is a statement concerning Jesus (Isa) which is unique in Muslim literature. The publication of the Rasā'il served to stir up agitation against the Isma'iliyya; al-Taqi, therefore, took the precaution to move about, always in the dress of a merchant, between Daylam, Kufa and Askar Mukram, his father's home.

It was when the Possessor of the Right [i.e Imam Muhammad al-Taqi) was informed about this theory that he compiled his Encyclopedia, revealing in it four philosophical disciplines, which his enemies could not do. With the help of this the pillars of the sharia have been strengthened, and its laws have become enforced by the support of parallels, and allusions to the real meaning, which neither could be neglected, nor regarded as impossible.

— Idris Imad al-Din, Zahr al-maʿānī

According to the Isma'ili tradition, caliph al-Ma'mun was eager to discover the source of Rasāʿil Ikhwān al-ṣafā' and gathered a group of scholars to discuss the text; a representative of al-Taqi, popularly referred to as Da'i al-Tirmidhi, participated in these discussions. al-Ma'mun pretended to have completely accepted Isma'ili doctrine and expressed the desire to meet with al-Taqi, and said, "I am an ardent lover of the Imam [al-Taqi]. I cherish a desire to hand over my caliphate to the Imam when I behold him and will serve him wholeheartedly." Al-Tirmidhi was not sure of the sincerity of this request, however, to protect al-Taqi, said that he himself was the Imam. Al-Ma'mun quickly had al-Tirmidhi beheaded.

Al-Taqi is reported to have died in 225/840 in Salamiyah after bequeathing the office of Imamate to his son, al-Husayn surnamed, Abd Allah al-Radi. His another son, Muhammad Abu'l-Shalaghlagh, surnamed Sa'id al-Khayr, whose posterity were living in Salamiyah and killed at the hands of the Qarmatians in 290/902.

== See also ==
- Family tree of Muhammad
- List of Isma'ili imams
- Imamate in Nizari doctrine

== Sources ==
- Halm, H. (1984). "Aḥmad ibn ʿAbdallāh". Encyclopaedia Iranica. Vol. I. pp. 638–639.
- Daftary, Farhad (2007). The Ismāʿı̄lı̄s: Their History and Doctrines (Second ed.). Cambridge: Cambridge University Press. ISBN 978-0-521-61636-2.
- Tajddin, Mumtaz Ali (1997). Ismailis Through History (PDF). Karachi: Islamic book publisher.
- Tajddin, Mumtaz Ali (2009). Brief history of the Shia Ismaili Imams. Karachi.
- Ivanow, Vladimir (1942). Ismaili Tradition Concerning the Rise of the Fatimids. Islamic Research Association. OCLC 675496.
- Hollister, John Norman (1953). The Shi'a of India. Luzac. ISBN 978-8170691068.
- Leaman, Oliver, ed. (2015). "Ikhwān al-ṣafā". The Biographical Encyclopedia of Islamic Philosophy. Bloomsbury Publishing. ISBN 9781472569455.
- Makarem, Sami Nasib (1969). The Hidden Imams of the Ismailis. al-Abhath.
- Jiwa, Shainool (2018). The Fatimids. 1. The Rise of a Muslim Empire. London and New York: I.B. Tauris. ISBN 978-1-78453-935-1.
- Daftary, Farhad (1998). A short history of the Ismailis. Edinburgh University Press. ISBN 978-0-7486-0687-0.
- Nasr, Seyyed Hossein (1966). Ideals and Realities of Islam. Praeger.
- Rahim, Habibeh (2004). "Taqi Muhammad". In Jestice, Phyllis G. (ed.). Holy People of the World: A Cross-Cultural Encyclopedia. Bloomsbury Academic. ISBN 978-1-57607-355-1.
- Madelung, Wilferd; Halm, Heinz (2016). "Ḥamdān Qarmaṭ". In Fleet, Kate; Krämer, Gudrun; Matringe, Denis; Nawas, John; Rowson, Everett (eds.). Encyclopaedia of Islam (3rd ed.). Brill Online. doi:10.1163/1573-3912_ei3_COM_30252. ISSN 1873-9830.

Muhammad al-Taqi of the Ahl al-Bayt Banu Hashim Clan of the Quraysh Born: 174 AH ≈ 790 AD Died: 225 AH ≈ 840 AD
Shia Islam titles
Preceded by Ahmad al-Wafi	9th Imam of Isma'ilism	Succeeded by Abd Allah al-Radi
