= Imamate in Ismaili doctrine =

Concept in Ismaili theology

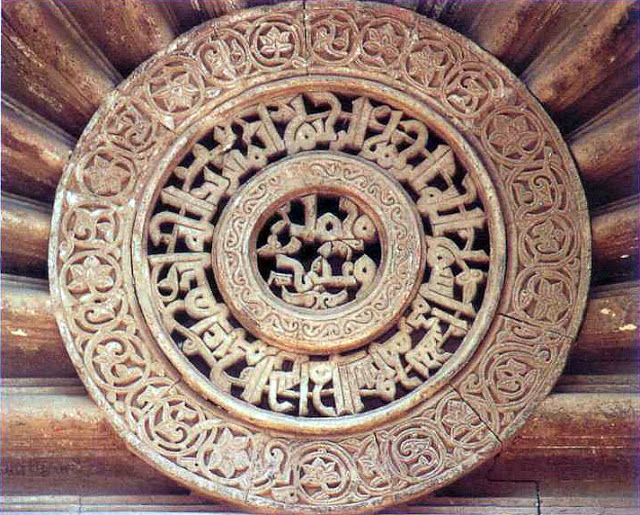
The Qur'anic verse 33:33 inscribed in a Fatimid medallion magnifying the purity of Ahl al-Bayt and their Du'at.

The doctrine of the Imamate in Isma'ilism differs from that of the Twelvers because the Isma'ilis had living Imams for centuries after the last Twelver Imam went into concealment. They followed Isma'il ibn Ja'far, elder brother of Musa al-Kadhim, as the rightful Imam after his father, Ja'far al-Sadiq. The Ismailis believe that whether Imam Ismail did or did not die before Imam Ja'far, he had passed on the mantle of the imamate to his son Muhammad ibn Isma'il as the next imam.

== The Seven Imāms ==
=== Qarmatian – Imamāte of Seven Imāms ===
According to some early Isma'ilis, the Seveners, as well as the Qarmatians, a splinter group, the number of imams was fixed, with seven Imams preordained by God. These groups consider Muhammad ibn Isma'il, the foundation Imam of the Isma'ili branch of Shia Islam, to be the Mahdi and to be preserved in hiding, which is referred to as the Occultation.

Qarmatians believed that Muhammad ibn Isma'il was Imām al-Qā'im al-Mahdi, and the last of the great messenger–prophets. On his reappearance, he would bring a new religious law by abrogating the one conveyed by the Islamic prophet Muhammad. Qarmatians recognized a series of Seven law-announcing prophets called ūlul’l-ʿazm, namely, Nūh, Ibrāhīm, Mūsā, ʿIsā, Muhammad bin ʿAbd Allāh, Ali ibn Abu Tālib, and Muhammad bin Ismā‘īl, who was the seal of the series.

Imām	Personage	Period
1	Ali ibn Abi Talib; Imām and a messenger: prophet (Rasūl) as well	(632–661)
2	Hasan ibn Ali	(661–669)
3	Husayn ibn Ali	(669–680)
4	Ali ibn Husayn Zayn al-Abidin	(680–713)
5	Muhammad al-Baqir	(713–733)
6	Ja'far al-Sadiq	(733–765)
7	Muhammad ibn Isma'il; Imām al-Qā'im al-Mahdi also a messenger-prophet (Rasūl)	(775–813)

=== Early beliefs ===
According to the early Ismāʿīlis, God sent Seven great prophets, known as nātiq "speakers", in order to disseminate and improve Islam. All of these great prophets has an assistant, the Sāmad (Silent) Imam. After six silent imams, a nātiq was sent to reinvigorate Islam. After Adam and his son Seth, and after six “Nātiq” (Speaker) – “Sāmad” (Silent) silsila (Noah–Shem), (Abraham–Ishmael), (Moses–Aaron or Joshua), (Jesus–Simeon), (Muhammad bin ʿAbd Allāh–Ali ibn Abu Tālib); the silsila of “Nātıqs and Sāmads have been completed with (Muhammad bin Ismā‘īl as-ṣaghīr (Maymūn al-Qaddāh) – ʿAbd Allāh Ibn-i Maymūn and his sons).

Early Ismāʿīlis believed that hierarchical history of the mankind is created in Seven Eras of various durations each one inaugurated by "speaker-prophet" (known as nātiq). In the first Six Eras of human history, nātiqs or ūlul’l-ʿazm had been Adam, Nūh, Ibrāhīm, Mūsā, ʿIsā, Muhammad bin ʿAbd Allāh. Qarmatians, on the other hand, originally included Ali ibn Abu Tālib instead of Adam in their list of law-announcing prophets. Later substitution of Adam in place of Ali as one of the nātiqs, and the reduction of Ali's rank from a prophet level to that of Muhammad's successor indicate the renouncement of their extremist views. Furthermore, they believed that each of the first six nātiqs were succeeded by a spiritual legatee called wāsi or foundation asās or silent sāmit, who interpreted the inner esoteric (batin) meaning of the revelation. Each sāmit in turn was followed by Seven Imāms called atimmā', who guarded the true meaning of the scriptures and the laws.

In the Ismaili interpretation, the Imam is the guide and the intercessor between humans and God, and the individual through whom God is recognized. He is also responsible for the interpretation (ta’wil) of the Quran. He is the possessor of divine knowledge and therefore the “Prime Teacher”. According to the “Epistle of the Right Path”, a Persian Ismaili prose text from the post-Mongol period of Ismaili history, by an anonymous author, there has been a chain of Imams since the beginning of time, and there will continue to be an Imam present on the Earth until the end of time. The worlds would not exist in perfection without this uninterrupted chain of Imamate. The proof (hujja) and gate (bāb) of the Imam are always aware of his presence and are witness to this uninterrupted chain.

According to Nasir al-Din al-Tusi, a Nizari Ismaili intellectual of the Alamut period, the Imams are the Possessors of the Command, upon whom obedience is ordered by God in Sura an-Nisa, Ayah 59: "Obey God and obey the Messenger and the Possessors of the Command". An old command may be superseded by a newer one, and therefore those who hold to the command rather than the Commander, in the Ismaili view, may go astray. Through this framework, the Ismailis give primacy to the living Word, or the Imam of the Time, over the recorded word.

== The first seven Musta'li and Nizari imams ==
=== Tayyibi Musta'li and Nizari imams ===
The Nizari and Musta'li have several Imams in common; the Nizari consider Ali the first Imam and his son Hasan a pir while the Musta'li label him al-Asās or "the Foundation" and call Hasan the first Imam.

Nizari	Musta'li	Personage	Period
1	Asās/Wāsīh	Ali	(632–661)
Pir	1	Hasan ibn Ali	(661–669) Mustaali
2	2	Husayn ibn Ali	(669–680) (Mustaali) (661–680) (Nizari)
3	3	Ali ibn Husayn Zayn al-Abidin	(680–713)
4	4	Muhammad al-Baqir	(713–733)
5	5	Ja'far al-Sadiq	(733–765)
6	6	Isma'il ibn Ja'far	(765–775)
7	7	Muhammad ibn Isma'il	(775–813)

=== Imams after Muhammad ibn Isma'il ===
- Abadullah ibn Muhammad (Ahmad al-Wafi) (813–829)
- Ahmad ibn Abadullah (Muhammad at-Taqi) (829–840)
- Husayn ibn Ahmad (Radi Abdullah) (840–881)

== Sources ==
- Brett, Michael (2017). The Fatimid Empire. The Edinburgh History of the Islamic Empires. Edinburgh: Edinburgh University Press. ISBN 978-0-7486-4076-8.
- Daftary, Farhad (2007). The Ismāʿı̄lı̄s: Their History and Doctrines (Second ed.). Cambridge: Cambridge University Press. ISBN 978-0-521-61636-2.
- Madelung, W. (1971). "Imāma". In Lewis, B.; Ménage, V. L.; Pellat, Ch. & Schacht, J. (eds.). The Encyclopaedia of Islam, Second Edition. Volume III: H–Iram. Leiden: E. J. Brill. pp. 1163–1169. OCLC 495469525.
- Makarem, Sami N., ed. (1977). The Political Doctrine of the Ismāʿīlīs: The Imamate. An edition and translation with introduction and notes of Abu'l Fawaris Ahmad ibn Ya'qub's 'ar-Risala fi l-Imama'. Delmar, New York: Caravan Books.
- Stern, S. M. (1951). "The Succession to the Fatimid Imam al-Āmir, the Claims of the Later Fatimids to the Imamate, and the Rise of Ṭayyibī Ismailism". Oriens. 4 (2): 193–255. doi:10.2307/1579511. JSTOR 1579511.
