= Fathites =

Now-extinct branch of Shia Islam

The Fathites, also Aftahiyya or Fathiyya (Arabic: الفطحية), are a now-extinct branch of Shia Islam, who were supporters of Abdallah al-Aftah, believing him to be the imam after the death of his father Ja'far al-Sadiq, the sixth imam of Shiism, in 765 CE. Abdallah's inheritance of the imamate was contested, with varying stories stating that either that he died within 70 days of his father, or that he was not sufficiently competent.

One faction of Fathites believed that Abdallah al-Aftah had a son, Muhammad, who inherited the imamate. Others, however, believe Abdallah died without issue, and many Fathites later rejoined the Shia mainstream, becoming followers of Musa al-Kadhim, Ja'far's other son who is recognized as the seventh imam by the Twelver Shia.

== Fathites amongst Shia ==
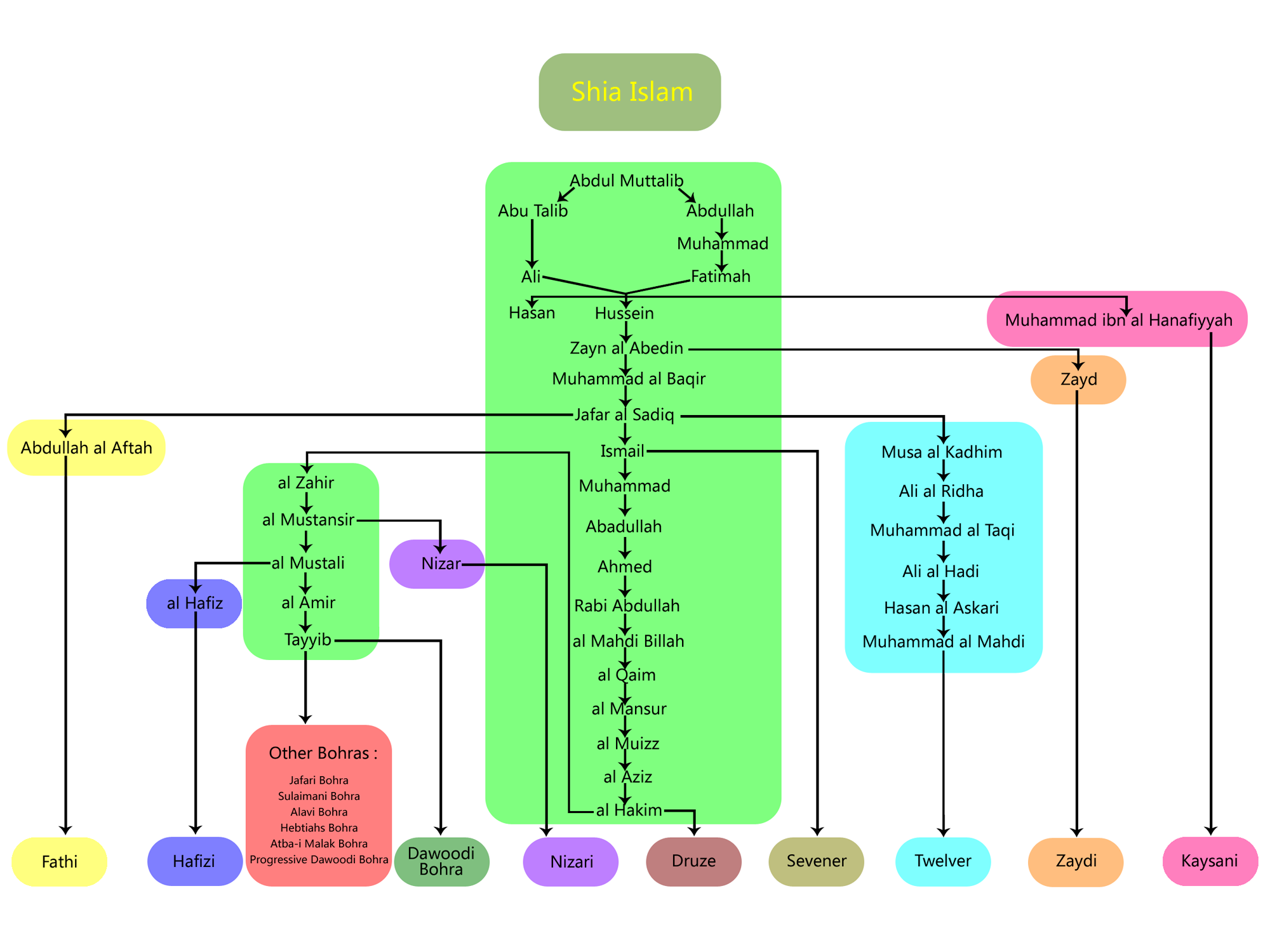
(Note: Kaysani's Imam Hanafiyyah is descendant of Ali from Ali's wife Khawlah, not Fatimah. Druze bifurcated after Imam Hakim are no more Shia.)

Fathites amongst Shia Islam

== See also ==
- List of extinct Shia sects
