= Muhammad ibn Isma'il =

Seventh of the Isma'ili Shia Imams (740–813)

Muhammad al-Maktum مُحَمَّد ٱلْمَكتُوم Seventh Imam of Isma'ilism

7th Isma'ili Imam
- In office 775 – 813 CE
- Preceded by: Isma'il al-Mubarak
- Succeeded by: Ahmad al-Wafi
- Title: al-Maktum (lit. 'the hidden one') al-Shakir (lit. 'the grateful one')

Personal life
- Born: 122 AH ≈ 740 AD Medina
- Died: 197 AH ≈ 813 AD Salamiyah
- Children: List of children: Ahmad al-Wafi; Ja'far; Isma'il; Ali; Husayn; Abdullah; Yahya; Ahmad
- Parents: Isma'il al-Mubarak (father); Umm Farwa (mother)

Religious life
- Religion: Shia Islam

Muhammad ibn Isma'il al-Maktum (Arabic: مُحَمَّد ٱبْن إسْماعِيل ٱلْمَكتُوم, romanized: Muḥammad ibn Ismāʿīl al-Maktūm; c. 740–813) was the eldest son of Isma'il al-Mubarak and the seventh imam in Isma'ilism. When Isma'il died, his son Muhammad continued to live in Medina under the care of his grandfather Ja'far al-Sadiq until the latter's death in 148/765. After the death of Abd Allah al-Aftah, Muhammad was the most senior member of the Husaynid branch of the Alids. However, due to the rival group that recognised Musa al-Kazim as their imam, and the Abbasid Caliphate's persecution of all Alid partisans, Muhammad fled Medina with his sons for the east. For this reason, he was known as al-Maktum (lit. 'the hidden one'). He had two sons when living in Medina and then four more sons after his emigration, among whom was his successor Ahmad al-Wafi. Muhammad's descendants became the Fatimid dynasty that ruled Ifriqiya and later Egypt and much of the Levant, and founded Cairo.

== Life ==
Muhammad was the eldest son of Isma'il ibn Ja'far, and the eldest grandson of the Shi'a imam, Ja'far al-Sadiq. Muhammad's life is relatively obscure, with most information known today deriving from the account of the 15th-century Yemeni Isma'ili scholar and religious leader, Idris Imad al-Din. His mother was a slave-wife (umm al-walad) called Umm Farwa. (Note: Al-Mufid records an Umm Farwa as the full sister of Isma'il ibn Ja'far. So, there might be a possibility of confusion in Idris' record.) The sources claim that Muhammad was 26 years old in 765, meaning that he was born in c. 738, while one source, the Dastūr al-Munajjimīn, places his birth in Dhu al-Hijja 121/November 739. Muhammad passed his early life with his grandfather for 24 years, and 10 years with his family in Medina.

Most sources agree that Muhammad's father Isma'il had been designated by al-Sadiq as his successor, but Isma'il apparently predeceased al-Sadiq. Upon al-Sadiq's death in 765, the issue of succession was open, and his partisans split up into different groups: most followed Isma'il's only full brother, Abdallah al-Aftah; others followed Musa al-Kazim or Muhammad al-Dibaj, Isma'il's half-brothers; a faction held that the designation had passed to Isma'il's son, Muhammad, while others held that Isma'il was not dead, but in hiding and that he would return as the mahdi. Al-Aftah died a few months after al-Sadiq, leaving Muhammad ibn Isma'il as the eldest member of al-Sadiq's family—Musa al-Kazim was not only younger by about eight years than him, but also the son of a slave concubine, rather than of al-Sadiq's wife Fatima, who could boast of Alid descent, being the granddaughter of al-Hasan ibn Ali. However, at al-Aftah's death most of the latter's followers went over to Musa al-Kazim. Threatened by his uncle's supporters, Muhammad abandoned his native Medina for the east, going into hiding and acquiring the epithet al-Maktum (lit. 'the hidden one').

The Sunni historian al-Tabari (d. 923) refers to Muhammad as a rāwī, a title he must have earned before his concealment.

He was in Medina when he rose to the protection of the religion of God, despatched his da'is, spread his doctrine, and ordered his missionaries to scarch for the 'land of refuge' (dar hijra) in which to seek safety.

— Idris Imad al-Din, ʿUyūn al-Akhbār

Juvayni (d. 1283) records that, during the Abbasid persecution carried out against Isma'il ibn Ja'far, Muhammad and his brother Ali were in hiding in Medina. Muhammad left Medina to escape Abbasid espionage and thereafter lived incognito, his whereabouts being known to only a few of his most responsible followers. Different sources mention various localities and regions as his final destination, but it is certain that he first went to southern Iraq and then to Persia. According to the later Isma'ilis, this emigration marks the beginning of the period of concealment (dawr al-satr) in early Isma'ilism, the concealment ending with the establishment of the Fatimid caliphate (r. 909–1171).

Muhammad ibn Isma'il seems to have spent the latter part of his life in Khuzestan, in southwestern Persia, where he had a certain number of supporters and from where he despatched his own da'is to adjoining areas.

== Death ==
The exact date of Muhammad's death remains unknown. But it is almost certain that he died during the caliphate of the celebrated Harun al-Rashid (r. 786–809), perhaps soon after 179/795–796, the year in which al-Rashid, continuing the anti-Alid policy of his predecessors, arrested Musa al-Kazim in Medina and banished him to Iraq as a prisoner. The Twelver sources, which are hostile to Muhammad ibn Isma'il, maintain that it was he who betrayed Musa to the Abbasids, though they also relate the story of a reconciliation between these two Alids prior to Muhammad's departure for Iraq.

== Family ==
Muhammad had two sons who were apparently born to him before his migration to the East,—Isma'il and Ja'far. They seem to be quite historical, left large posterity, are very rarely referred to in Isma'ili works, and apparently played no part in sectarian life. After his emigration, he had four more sons, including Abdullah, who, according to the later Isma'ilis, was his rightful successor.

== See also ==
- Family tree of Muhammad
- List of Isma'ili imams
- Imamate in Nizari doctrine

== Sources ==
- Daftary, Farhad (2007). The Ismāʿı̄lı̄s: Their History and Doctrines (Second ed.). Cambridge: Cambridge University Press. ISBN 978-0-521-61636-2.
- Tajddin, Mumtaz Ali (2009). Brief history of the Shia Ismaili Imams. Karachi.
- Ivanow, Vladimir (1942). Ismaili Tradition Concerning the Rise of the Fatimids. Islamic Research Association. OCLC 675496.
- Hollister, John Norman (1953). The Shi'a of India. Luzac. ISBN 978-8170691068.
- Buyukkara, Mehmet Ali (1997). The Imāmi Shi'i movement in the time of Mūsā al-Kāẓim and 'Ali al-Riḍa. Edinburgh University Press.

Muhammad ibn Isma'il Husaynids Branch of the Alids Born: 122 AH (≈ 740 CE) Died: 197 AH (≈ 813 CE)
Shia Islam titles
Preceded by Isma'il al-Mubarak	7th Imam of Isma'ilism; 775–813	Succeeded by Ahmad al-Wafi
