= Seven pillars of Ismailism =

Guiding principles

The Ismā'īlī Shi'a (the Nizari, and Mustaali) have more pillars than those of the Sunni. The Shahadah (profession of faith) is not considered a pillar and is instead seen as the foundation upon which they are built. The members of Druze faith also have seven pillars, though not every concept is the same.

== Ismā'īlī pillars ==
- Walayah "guardianship" denotes love and devotion to God, the prophets, the scripture, the imams and the du'āt "missionaries". In Ismā'īlī doctrine, God is one and the true desire of every soul, creator of everything. The appointed du'āt lead believers to the right path.
- Taharah "purity": The Ismā'īlī lay special emphasis on purity and its related practices, and the Nizari consider this in a more esoteric sense too and apply it to purity of mind, soul and action, the Musta'lis also apply it to ritual practices related to prayer and cleanliness.
- Salat "prayer": Nizari Ismā'īliyya reason that it is up to the current imām to designate the style and form of prayer, and for this reason the current Nizari prayer is called Du'a and they pray three times a day. These three times have been related with the three times that have been mentioned in the Qur'an: sunrise, before sunset, and after sunset. In contrast, the Musta'lī maintain five prayers and their style is generally closely related to that of the Twelvers.
- Zakah "charity": All Ismā'īlī have practices resembling that of Sunni and Twelver Muslims with the addition of the characteristic Shī'a khums: payment of one fifth of all income earned at the end of the year to the imām. Nizari Ismā'īlīs donate 10% to 12.5% of their monthly net income (after taxes, basic living necessities and debt repayment) to the Imām, an amount which includes zakat and khums. Part of this money is typically paid to organizations run by the Aga Khan Development Network, one of the biggest welfare networks in the world. Thus, Ismā'īlīs believe that as Muhammad was designated to take zakāt from the believers in the past, it is now the duty to pay the imām or his representative.
- Sawm "fasting": Nizari and Musta'lī believe in both a metaphorical and literal meaning of fasting. The literal meaning is that one must fast as an obligation, such as during the Ramadan and the metaphorical meaning being that one is in attainment of the Divine Truth and must strive to avoid worldly activities which may detract from this goal. In particular, Ismā'īlīs believe the real and esoteric meaning of fasting is avoiding devilish acts and doing good deeds. Not eating during the month of Ramadan in conjunction with a metaphorical implementation of fasting.
- Hajj "pilgrimage": For Ismā'īlīs, visiting the imām or his representative is one of the most aspired pilgrimages. There are two pilgrimages, Hajj-i-Zahiri and Hajj-i-Batini. The first is the visit to Mecca; the second, being in the presence of the Imam. The Musta'lī also maintain the practice of going to Mecca.
- Jihad "Struggle": The definition of jihad is controversial as it has two meanings: "the Greater Struggle" and "the Lesser Struggle", the latter of which means a confrontation with the enemies of the faith. The Nizari are pacifist and interpret "adversaries" of the faith as personal and social vices (i.e. wrath, intolerance, etc.) and those individuals who harm the peace of the faith and avoid provocation and use force only as a final resort only in self-defense.

== Druze list ==
The ordering of the pillars as understood by Druze is as follows:

1. Taslīm "submission" denotes love and devotion to God, the prophets, the Imām (al-Hakīm) and the du‘āt "missionaries". In Ismā‘īlī doctrine, God is the true desire of every soul, and he manifests himself in the forms of prophets and imāms; the appointed du‘āt lead believers to the right path.
2. Shahādatayn "profession of faith".
3. Sidqu l-Lisān "speaking truth (to/about God)": The Druze believe that the meaning of prayer is sidqu l-lisān
4. Hifzu l-Ikhwān "protection of one's brothers": The Druze practice a culturally complex system of interdependence instead of a set fee to a religious scholar or organisation (i.e. zakat)
5. Tark ‘Ibādat al-Awthān "deserting idol-worship": The Druze emphasise the esoteric meaning of the traditional pillar called sawm, by which they mean that which detracts from communion with God is an idol (wathan).
6. Hajj "pilgrimage": The Druze interpret this completely metaphorically as "fleeing from devils and oppressors"
7. Rīda "contentment": The Druze have a long history of military and political engagement, but refer to this pillar solely as the struggle (jihad) to fight that which removes one from the ease of the Divine Presence, a meaning similar to that of the Nizari. In addition, the ‘Uqqāl "Wise Ones", the religious cadre of the Druze, are pacifists.

== See also ==
- Sunni Five Pillars of Islam and Six articles of belief and Sixth pillar of Islam.
- Shi'a twelvers Principles of the Faith and Ancillaries of the Faith
