= Isma'il ibn Ja'far =

Sixth of the Isma'ili Shia Imams

Isma'il ibn Ja'far إسْماعِيل ٱلْمُبَارَك Sixth Imam of Isma'ilism

6th Isma'ili Imam
- In office 765–CE
- Preceded by: Ja'far al-Sadiq
- Succeeded by: Muhammad al-Maktum
- Title: al-Azbab al-Itlaq (lit. 'the absolute lord'); al-Mubarak (lit. 'the blessed one'); al-Wafi (lit. 'true to one's word')

Personal life
- Born: c. 719/722 CE (100/103 AH) Medina
- Died: c. 765/775 CE (148/158 AH)
- Children: Muhammad; Ali; Fatima
- Parents: Ja'far al-Sadiq (father); Fatima bint al-Husayn al-Athram ibn al-Hasan ibn Ali (mother)

Religious life
- Religion: Shia Islam

Isma'il ibn Ja'far (Arabic: إسْماعِيل ٱبْن جَعْفَر ٱلْمُبَارَك, romanized: Ismāʿīl ibn Jaʿfar al-Mubārak) was the eldest son of Ja'far al-Sadiq and the sixth Imam in Isma'ilism. He carried the epithet of al-Mubarak, on the basis of which one of the earliest Isma'ili groups became designated as the Mubarakiyya.

It seems likely that the Mubarakiyya were originally supporters of Isma'il before acknowledging Muhammad ibn Isma'il as their Imam. At any rate, Mubarakiyya was thus one of the original names of the nascent Isma'iliyya, a term coined by later heresiographers. A faction of the Mubarakiyya later developed into the Fatimid Isma'ilis, upholding the continuity of the Imamate in the progeny of al-Mubarak, acknowledging al-Mubarak himself as their sixth Imam. This enumeration was subsequently retained by the various branches of the Isma'ili.

A major crisis arose among the Shia after the death of Ja’far al-Sadiq, who had five sons. Abd Allah al-Aftah and Isma'il al-Mubarak were the eldest sons by his first wife Fatima, a granddaughter of Hasan Ibn Ali. Al-Mubarak was probably the second son of al-Sadiq. The exact date and circumstances of al-Mubarak's death also remain obscure. According to some Isma'ili authors, al-Mubarak survived al-Sadiq. Some sources, mainly Twelver texts, report that al-Mubarak died during the lifetime of al-Sadiq—but those same sources also report that al-Mubarak was seen several days later in Basra, suggesting that he did not really die but was sent away out of Medina.

== Sources ==
Information about the life of Isma'il al-Mubarak, his connections and the movement carried out by his followers is extremely rare. Among the early works, only a few Twelver sources give some information about the subject. However, due to open rivalry between the Isma'ilis and the Twelvers, the information derived from the Twelver books always carries the risk of being one-sided and thus its authenticity is open to doubt. On the other hand, early Isma'ili sources give almost nothing for this period. As the Islamicist Farhad Daftary observes, because of being religious and philosophical in their character contain little historical information on the initial period of the sect, and those which have information, because of the views contained in them were in conflict with the official Fatimid doctrines, probably were subjected to later censorship by the Fatimid Isma'ilis.

An important Isma'ili work is Uyūn al-Akhbār written by Idris Imad al-Din (d. 1468), an Isma'ili da'i in Yemen. One volume of this work contains some important historical material relating to al-Mubarak and his son Muhammad. According to the orientalist Vladimir Ivanov (d. 1970), Idris quoted this information literally from an early work, Sharḥ al-Akhbār fī Faḍā'il al-A'imma al-Aṭhār, written by the Isma'ili jurist and theologian Abu Hanifa Nu'man ibn Muhammad al-Tamimi, who is well-known as al-Qadi al-Nu'man (d. 974). Another work of Idris is Zahr al-Ma'ānī; it gives a review of the Isma'ili Imams. The third Isma'ili work is Asrār al-Nuṭaqā' written by Ja'far ibn Mansur al-Yaman, a contemporary of al-Qadi al-Nu'man. The main subject of the book is the story of Abraham, and the proofs of the right of al-Mubarak to the Imamate. As Ivanov says, it contains a strong controversial element directed against the Twelvers.

== Life ==
Isma'il ibn Ja'far ibn Muhammad al-Mubarak's birth date is unknown, but apparently he was the second son of Ja'far al-Sadiq, born between 80 and 83/699–702. His mother, Fatima bint al-Husayn al-Athram ibn al-Hasan ibn Ali, was the first wife of al-Sadiq. (Note: Both Isma'ili and Twelver sources agree that the name of the first wife of al-Sadiq was Fatima. According to the Sharḥ al-Akhbār, she was Fatima bint al-Hasan ibn al-Husayn (or al-Hasan) ibn 'Ali; and in the 'Umdat al-Ṭālib, Fatima bint al-Husayn al-Athram ibn al-Hasan.) Her mother was Asma, daughter of Aqil ibn Abi Talib. The Sunni theologian Muhammad al-Shahrastani (d. 1153) writes in his Kitāb al-Milal wa al-Niḥal that during the lifetime of Fatima, al-Sadiq never got another marriage like Muhammad with Khadija and Ali with Fatima. Al-Mubarak was the full-brother of Abd Allah al-Aftah, the Imam of the Fathiyya (or Aftahiyya).

The early life of al-Mubarak is obscure except few fragmented records. He was alive in 133/751, when Dawud ibn Ali, the governor of Medina, executed Mu'alla ibn Khunays probably because of his agency on behalf of al-Sadiq and his involvement in some revolutionary activities of Muhammad al-Nafs al-Zakiyya, al-Sadiq, as soon as he heard the news of the execution of Mu'alla, went to the governor with his son al-Mubarak and called him to account for this murder. The governor Dawud put the blame on his chief of shurta (the chief of his police force), al-Sayrafi. According to the Twelver al-Kashshi (d. 978), al-Sadiq directed al-Mubarak to kill al-Sayrafi, which he did. In Idris' report, al-Sadiq then handed him over to al-Mu'alla's associates and they killed him.

Riyah ibn Uthman al-Murri, the Abbasid governor in Medina burnt the house of Ahl al-Bayt, and al-Mubarak was decided to be killed. Ahmad ibn Ali al-Najashi (d. 1058) writes in his Kitāb al-Rijāl, that al-Mubarak was involved in a militant anti-Abbasid plot in collaboration with several others, which included Bassam ibn Abdullah Sayrafi, a radical Shia engaged in money lending in Kufa. Bassam was brought out dead; Isma'il was spared probably due to his father's status. Muhammad Hasan al-Muzaffar (d. 1955) quotes al-Sadiq as saying that, "Isma'il was planned two times for killing, but I prayed for his life, and God protected him." This association is one of several reported by the Twelver sources which caused al-Sadiq to express his dissatisfaction with those radical Shias who were leading his son astray.

== Imamate ==
=== Designation ===
According to the majority of the available sources, al-Sadiq had indeed designated al-Mubarak by nass (divine decree) as his successor in Imamate. This fact was accepted as the formal act of nass required by Shia theory and was therefore a designation by an infallible Imam of the new Imam who would inherit the full powers of the Imamate. Al-Mubarak was thus not only al-Sadiq's choice but was God's choice as well. This designation, in fact, forms the basis of Isma'ili claims and which should have settled the question of al-Sadiq's succession in due course. According to the Isma'ili tradition, when al-Mubarak was seven years of age, al-Sadiq declared his Imamate. He was separated from his other brothers and kept away from contact with the public. Al-Sadiq himself undertook his education. As da'i Idris observes, this declaration was made secretly on the basis of taqiyya. Only certain selected followers of al-Sadiq knew this fact. Apparently, though, al-Sadiq did not appoint another in place of al-Mubarak and the theoretical argument by which he might have done so is, generally speaking, missing; although the later Twelver Shias claimed such a nass for Musa ibn Ja'far al-Kazim, the younger half brother of al-Mubarak, producing several hadiths to this effect. Twelver writers like al-Nawbakhti (d. 922) admitted as much even a hundred years after the fact.

After the death of al-Sadiq a great confusion arose amongst his sons as each of his surviving sons claimed the Imamate but could not produce sufficient credentials, and so their followers melted away in a short period except for two candidates: al-Mubarak and al-Kazim. Al-Mubarak was some twenty-five years older than his half-brother al-Kazim, who was born in 128/745–46 to a Berber slave-girl. Various historians relate that "all" of the sons of al-Sadiq contended for the position. In Kalām-i Pīr, an Isma'ili work wrongly attributed to Nasir Khusraw (d. 1088), there is an account of this contest, which was again carried for decision to the Black Stone at Mecca, as had been done by Zayn al-Abidin and Muhammad ibn al-Hanafiyya. This time the decision was in favour of al-Mubarak, after which al-Kazim swears allegiance to him.

Various reasons are given as an explanation for altering the nass al-Sadiq had given to al-Mubarak. That most frequently used by historians, mostly Sunni and Twelver, is that al-Mubarak had been drinking, to which the Isma'ili could reply, that the Imam being infallible would know a truth concerning drinking beyond the zahir command to abstain from it. More likely, It deserves to note that some bombastic stories of al-Mubarak's indulgence in drink and his alleged association with the extremists have been condemned by many historians. Mufaddal ibn Umar al-Sayrafi however relates that al-Sadiq, in view of his son's piety had already warned the people in Medina that, "Do not wrong Isma'il" (la tajafu Isma'ila).

With regard to the Twelver Shia claims that al-Mubarak had pre-deceased al-Sadiq, the Isma'ilis believe that al-Sadiq observed "taqiya" (dissimulation) and gave a chance to his real successor to go underground so that their enemy, the Abbasids, did not pursue al-Mubarak, and that his Imamate and his activities went un-noticed. Thus al-Kazim who was believed to be poisoned by the Abbasid Caliph Harun was in fact a veil (hījab) for al-Mubarak. The Sunni historian Rashid al-Din Hamadani (d. 1318) wrote that some Isma'ilis believed that al-Kazim willingly gave his life for the sake of his elder brother al-Mubarak, the true Imam. The Isma'ilis further argued that the Imam being ma'sum (infallible) could not make an error of Judgement and therefore the first nass (designation) of al-Sadiq was the correct one. Thus, this group accepted al-Mubarak as their Imam and are known as Isma'iliyya or Isma'ilis.

=== Relations with radical Shias ===
Al-Mubarak evidently had contacts with the activist Shias in his father's following, including al-Mufaddal ibn Umar al-Ju'fi. According to the historian al-Maqrizi (d. 1442), al-Mufaddal regarded al-Sadiq as God, so the Imam repudiated him and publicly cursed him. Al-Mubarak, who was reportedly involved in certain anti-Abbasid plots, may also have collaborated with Abu al-Khattab al-Asadi, another activist Shia originally in the entourage of al-Sadiq. Abu al-Khattab had been active in the Shia group with al-Sadiq, but the latter had to repudiate him openly, because of his extremist theological view, which he had endeavoured to enforce by militant means, though Abu al-Khattab supposedly maintained that the repudiation was part of al-Sadiq's technique at preserving his true nature. The Asrār also states that al-Sadiq had to forbid al-Mubarak to go to the school which Abu al-Khattab had been conducting.

Louis Massignon (d. 1962) has suggested that Abu al-Khattab was the spiritual or adoptive father of al-Mubarak, hence his kunya of Abu Isma'il. In this connection, he formulated a general hypothesis, contending that since the beginning of the second Islamic century, the expression anta minna Ahl al-Bayt ('you are from the Prophet's family') purportedly used by Muhammad in reference to Salman the Persian, and as reported in a hadith, had acquired a ritual value indicating 'spiritual adoption' amongst the revolutionary Shias, for whom real family ties were established through spiritual parentage, adoption or initiation. Possible collaboration between al-Mubarak and Abu al-Khattab remains shrouded in obscurity, despite the fact that the Twelver sources, generally hostile to the Isma'ilis, identify the nascent Isma'ili with the early Khattabiyya; the later Isma'ilis regarded Abu al-Khattab as a heretic and repudiated the Khattabiyya.

=== The doctrine of bada ===
The Twelver Shia believe that al-Sadiq revoked his first nass in favour of al-Mubarak with radical Shias and made a second nass in favour of his son al-Kazim. This newly contrived theory took its early nourishment among the people who lacked the concept of the Imamate. The Twelver scholar Abdulaziz Abdulhussein Sachedina confirms the problems inherent in the doctrine of bada: "It implied God's change of mind (bada) because of a new consideration, caused by the death of Isma'il. However, such connotations in the doctrine of bada (change of mind) raised serious questions about the nature of God's knowledge, and indirectly, about the ability of the Imams to prophesy future occurrences." Al-Sadiq is also reported to have said: "Inlillah fi kullo shain bida illah Imamah" means, "Verily, God makes changes in everything except in the matter of Imam." This point merits further indication al-Sadiq had no power to cancel, revoke or alter the first nass in favour of al-Mubarak, and therefore, the tradition of change of nass carries no historicity. Al-Nawbakhti writes in Kitāb Firaq al-Shī'a that, "Yet another version is that by appointing his son, Isma'il, as an Imam, al-Sadiq thus resigned. Isma'il was therefore a real Imam, and after him, the Imamate has to pass to his son, Muhammad." Al-Shahrastani writes in Kitāb al-Milal wa al-Niḥal that, "Designation (nass), however, cannot be withdrawn, and has the advantage that the Imamate remains in the descendants of the person designated, to the exclusion of others. Therefore, the Imam after Isma'il is Muhammad ibn Isma'il."

=== Succession ===
The Mubarakiyya claimed that, when al-Mubarak was alive, he appointed his son Muhammad as his heir and sent his da'is to different regions to administer the oath in his name. Another proto-Isma'ili group which is recorded by the sources deemed that al-Sadiq, not al-Mubarak, designated Muhammad ibn Isma'il as the seventh Imam, and he was the last Imam and the Mahdi who remained alive and would return as the Qa'im. This group is said to have formed the nucleus of the Qaramita sect which regarded Muhammad as their seventh and last Imam. Ja'far ibn Mansur al-Yaman writes in Asrār al-Nuṭaqā' that, "Both we and you admit the tradition that when Isma'il was about to die, he summoned his son and his followers, and handed over the Imamate to him, in their presence, under the supervision of his father [al-Sadiq]. He entrusted the testimony concerning the position of his son to one of his ḥujjats [i.e. da'is], as did his forefather Ishmael (Isma'il) with regard to the person surnamed al-Kabsh [lit. 'sheep'], appointed before him. He made him the "veil" for his heir, to distract towards him the attention of the tyrants of the time. And al-Sadiq presided over the assembly, as Jacob (Ya'qub) presided over the assembly of Joseph (Yusuf) when the latter was on his deathbed."

The Mubarakiyya held that the right of the Imamate must pass from al-Mubarak, the father, to Muhammad, the son, because the Imamate could not be transferred from brother to brother after the case of Imams al-Hasan and al-Husayn, the sons of 'Ali ibn Abi Talib: it can only go to [the Imam's] progeny. This was why they rejected the claims of al-Kazim and other brothers of al-Mubarak, as they did that of Muhammad ibn al-Hanafiyya, who, according to them, had falsely claimed the Imamate in rivalry with Ali ibn al-Husayn Zayn al-Abidin. At any rate, it is clear that the Mubarakiyya had come into existence in Isma'il's lifetime and they were originally his supporters. It may safely be assumed that Mubarakiyya was one of the original name of the nascent Isma'ilism, as well as the regional identifications of the followers of al-Mubarak, who, on the whole, merged into the main fold of Isma'ilism in the time of Muhammad ibn Isma'il.

Al-Nawbakhti, who is best informed about this period, says that the group which supported Muhammad was called the Mubarakiyya after al-Mubarak who was a client, or mawla, of Isma'il. Ivanov has shown that al-Mubarak was the epithet of Isma'il himself, on the basis of some passages from the famous Isma'ili da'i of the 4th/10th century, Abu Ya'qub al-Sijistani, as well as other sources.

== Death ==
The exact date and the circumstances of al-Mubarak's death also remain unknown. According to the Isma'ili tradition, al-Mubarak died in 158/775, and was buried at the Maqam al-Imam (lit. 'the shrine of the Imam') in Salamiyah, a city located in Syria. However, non-Isma'ili sources report that he died in Medina, and was buried in the Baqi cemetery there. The historians quote the tradition that al-Mubarak had died during his father's lifetime, but the followers of al-Mubarak refused to believe the rumours of his death. Al-Shahrastani writes in Kitāb al-Milal wa al-Niḥal that, "Some of them [followers of Isma'il] say that he did not die, but that his father had declared that he had died to save him from the Abbasid caliphs; and that he had held a funeral assembly to which al-Mansur's governor in Medina was made a witness." Hasan ibn Nuh al-Bharuchi (d. 1533), an Indian Isma'ili author, relates visiting al-Mubarak's grave in 904/1498. His grave was still there in 1302/1885, but it was later destroyed, along with other graves in the Baqi, by the Wahhabis.

Many Isma'ili and non-Isma'ili sources state that during al-Mubarak's funeral procession, al-Sadiq attempted to show the face of his dead son to witnesses. Some of the same sources also indicate that al-Mubarak was seen soon afterward in Basra, where he cured a paralytic in the market. (Note: It is reported that when the news that Isma'il had been seen in Basra reached the caliph al-Mansur in Baghdad, he immediately summoned al-Sadiq and questioned him about this matter. He showed al-Sadiq the letter in which the Imam had informed the caliph of Isma'il's death. Then he showed the reports of his spies in Basra. Therefore, al-Sadiq produced the testimony containing the signatures of those who had witnessed Ismail's death. So, al-Mansur was satisfied. He dismissed al-Sadiq also giving him some presents.)

A crowd of men surrounded Isma'il, all greeting him, and asking for protection. When the cripple, who was a Shia, a follower of al-Sadiq, saw him, he began to shout: ‘O descendant of the Messenger of God, stretch thy hand to me so that God may stretch His to thee.’ The young man returned, seized his hand, and brought him down from his shop. Then the cripple walked along with him a distance, leaving him later, and returned to his place healthy and straight in stature. People began to crowd around him, asking him who it was who healed him. And he replied: ‘Isma'il ibn Ja'far ibn Muhammad.

— Ja'far ibn Mansur al-Yaman, Asrār al-Nuṭaqā'

Another group claimed that he did not die but went into occultation, that he would appear again and would be the promised Mahdi. These Imami Shias further believed that al-Sadiq had announced al-Mubarak's death merely as a ruse to protect him from the persecution of the Abbasids who were angered by his political activities. The Twelver heresiographers al-Nawbakhti and al-Qummi call the members of this group, who recognised al-Mubarak as their Imam Mahdi, al-Isma'iliyya al-khalisa (lit. 'the pure Isma'ilis'), while some later heresiographers such as al-Shahrastani designate this group as "al-Isma'iliyya al-waqifa" which refers to those who stopped their line of Imams with al-Mubarak. The Twelver theologian Muhammad al-Mufid (d. 1022) records that in his time they were extremely rare and there was no knowledge of anyone from them who could be pointed out.

== Family ==
Ancestors of Isma'il ibn Ja'far

8. Ali ibn Husayn Zayn al-Abidin
4. Muhammad al-Baqir
9. Fatima bint Hasan
2. Ja'far al-Sadiq
10. Al-Qasim ibn Muhammad
5. Umm Farwa bint al-Qasim
11. Asma bint Abd al-Rahman
1. Isma'il ibn Jafar
12. Hasan ibn Ali
6. Husayn al-Athram
3. Fatima bint Husayn
14. Umar ibn Ali
7. Unnamed daughter

Besides Muhammad, al-Mubarak had a son called Ali, who was born in 130/748 and a daughter, Fatima.

== See also ==
- Family tree of Muhammad
- List of Isma'ili imams
- Imamate in Nizari doctrine

== Sources ==
- Daftary, Farhad (2007). The Ismāʿı̄lı̄s: Their History and Doctrines (Second ed.). Cambridge: Cambridge University Press. ISBN 978-0-521-61636-2.
- Tajddin, Mumtaz Ali (1997). Ismailis Through History (PDF). Karachi: Islamic book publisher. Archived from the original (PDF) on 2024-11-12.
- Tajddin, Mumtaz Ali (2009). Brief history of the Shia Ismaili Imams. Karachi.
- Daftary, Farhad (1998). "Esmā'il b. Ja'far al-Sādeq". Encyclopaedia Iranica. Vol. VIII (Online ed.). pp. 625–626.
- Momen, Moojan (1985). An Introduction to Shi'i Islam. Yale University Press. ISBN 9780300034998.
- Gleave, Robert (2008). "Jaʿfar al-Ṣādeq". Encyclopaedia Iranica. Vol. XIV. pp. 349–351.
- Rajput, Ali Mohammad (2013). Hasan-i-sabbah: His Life and Thought. Xlibris Corporation. ISBN 9781483626703.
- Walker, Paul E. (1995). "Succession to Rule in the Shiite Caliphate". Journal of the American Research Center in Egypt. 32: 239–264. doi:10.2307/40000841. JSTOR 40000841.
- Ivanow, Vladimir (1942). Ismaili Tradition Concerning the Rise of the Fatimids. Islamic Research Association. OCLC 675496.
- Hollister, John Norman (1953). The Shi'a of India. Luzac. ISBN 978-8170691068.
- Buyukkara, Mehmet Ali (1997). The Imāmi Shi'i movement in the time of Mūsā al-Kāẓim and 'Ali al-Riḍa. Edinburgh University Press.
- Wasserman, James (2020). Hasan-i-Sabah: Assassin Master. Nicolas-Hays. ISBN 978-0892541942.
- Tabatabai, Sayyid Mohammad Hosayn (1975). Shi'ite Islam. Translated by Sayyid Hossein Nasr. State University of New York Press. ISBN 0-87395-390-8.
- Daftary, Farhad (2013). A History of Shi'i Islam. I.B. Tauris. ISBN 9780755608669.
- Hussain, Jassim M. (1986). Occultation of the Twelfth Imam: A Historical Background (PDF). Routledge Kegan & Paul. ISBN 9780710301581.
- Sachedina, Abdulaziz Abdulhussein (1981). Islamic Messianism: The Idea of Mahdī in Twelver Shīʻism. Suny press. ISBN 978-0873954426.
- Donaldson, Dwight M. (1933). The Shi'ite Religion (A history of Islam in Persia and Irak). London: Luzac and Company.
- al-Nawbakhti, Abu Muhammad al-Hasan ibn Musa (2007). Kadhim, Abbas (ed.). Shiʿa sects (Kitāb Firaq al-Shīʿa). London: ICAS Press. ISBN 978-1-904063-26-1.

Isma'il al-Mubarak of the Ahl al-Bayt Banu Hashim Clan of the Quraysh Born: c. 122 AH (c. 719 CE) Died: …. AH (765/775 CE)
Shia Islam titles
Preceded by Ja'far al-Sadiq	6th Imam of Isma'ilism	Succeeded by Muhammad ibn Ismāʿīl al-Shākir
