= Vladimir Ivanow (orientalist) =

Russian orientalist (1886–1970)

Vladimir Alekseevich Ivanow
- Владимир Алексеевич Иванов
- Born: November 3, 1886; Saint Petersburg, Russian Empire
- Died: June 19, 1970 (aged 83); Tehran, Iran
- Education: Saint Petersburg Imperial University
- Scientific career
- Workplaces: Institute of Oriental Manuscripts of the Russian Academy of Sciences; Leningrad University
- Doctoral advisor: Vasily Bartold
- Notable students: Farhad Daftary

Vladimir Alekseevich Ivanow (Russian: Владимир Алексеевич Иванов; November 3, 1886 – June 19, 1970) was a Russian orientalist. He was a scholar of Islam, with a particular focus on Ismailism. He graduated in 1907 and joined the faculty of Oriental Languages of the University of St. Petersburg.

Vladimir Ivanow is a founding father of modern Isma'ili studies and one of the most authoritative scholars in the subject. He is a doctoral advisor of Farhad Daftary, the most authoritative scholar of the subject in the modern world.

== Bibliography ==
- Daftary, Farhad (2015). Fifty Years in the East: The Memoirs of Wladimir Ivanow. London: I.B. Tauris. ISBN 978-1784531522.
- "The Importance of Studying Ismailism". Ismaili Web.
- Concise Descriptive Catalogue of the Persian Manuscripts in the Curzon Collection. Kolkata: The Asiatic Society of Bengal. 1926.
- Ismaili Literature: A Bibliographical Survey (2nd ed.). Teheran: Tehran University Press. 1963. (Second Amplified Edition of "A Guide to Ismaili Literature")
- Catalogue of the Arabic manuscripts in the collection of the Royal Asiatic Society of Bengal, Asiatic Society (Calcutta, India) Library, Wladimir Ivanow, revised by M. Hidayat Hosain. Royal Asiatic Society of Bengal, (1939), 689 pages, 2 vols., 221 pages.
- The Gabri Dialect Spoken by the Zoroastrians of Persia (1940)
- Ismaili tradition concerning the rise of the Fatimids (1942). Volume 10 of the Islamic Research Association Series, Oxford Univ. Pr. in Komm., 450 pages .
- Ibn-al-Qaddah: (The Alleged Founder of Ismailism) (1946). The Ismaili Foundation, 2nd. edition, (1957), 169 pages,
- On the Recognition of the Imam: Or Fasl Dar Bayan-i Shinakht-i Imam (1947)
- Nāṣir-i Khusraw and Ismailism (1948).
- Studies in early Persian Ismailism. E.J. Brill, (1948) - 202 pages
- Naṣīr al-Dīn Muḥammad ibn Muḥammad Ṭūsī (translation)
- Catalogue of the Arabic Manuscripts in the Collection of the Asiatic Society of Bengal (1951), with M. Hidayat Hosain, M. Mahfuz-ul-Haq, M. Ishaque .
- Studies in early Persian Ismailism, 2nd ed. (1955)
- Problems in Nasir-i Khusraw's Biography (1956)
