= Imamate in Nizari doctrine =

Concept in a branch of Shia Islam

In Nizari Isma'ili doctrine, imamate (Arabic: إمامة) is a concept which defines the political, religious and spiritual dimensions of authority concerning Islamic leadership over the nation of believers. The primary function of the Imamate is to establish an institution between an Imam who is present and living in the world and his following whereby each are granted rights and responsibilities.

The Nizari Imamate follows a genealogy of male Imams originating from the prophethood of Muhammad by means of wedlock of his daughter Fatimah with his cousin Ali and in succession, through their son Hussein and his onward descendants up to the present day. Each ordained as successor Imam of this lineage is charged with serving the Nizari Ismailis community of his era, who are liable to pay the zakat (tithe) dues to him due to his being as ex-officio and the designated Nizari Imam. The Imam, in return, imparts to them religious and spiritual guidance and strives for their physical well-being to the best of his ability.

With respect to their spiritual and religious nature, the Imams are considered living manifestations of the divine word as well as intermediaries (wasilah in Qur'an 5:35) between God and the Ummah. Based on this belief, the Nizari Ismaili concept of Imamate differs from that of the Twelver's concept in that the Nizari Imams possess the authority to interpret the Quran according to the times and change or even abrogate any aspect of "The Way/The Path" (Sharia) of Islam. With respect to their political nature, the Imams are regarded by Nizaris as the Amir al-Mu'minin, or "Commander of the faithful".

The 50th and presently living Nizari Imam is Prince Shah Rahim al-Husseini Aga Khan V.

== Concepts ==
In the Ismaili interpretation of Shia Islam, the Imam is the guide and the intercessor between humans and God, and the individual through whom God is recognised. He is also responsible for the interpretation (ta’wil) of the Quran. He is the possessor of divine knowledge and therefore the "Prime Teacher". According to the "Epistle of the Right Path", a Persian Ismaili prose text from the post-Mongol period of Ismaili history by an anonymous author, there has been a chain of Imams since the beginning of time, and there will continue to be an Imam present on the Earth until the end of time. The worlds would not exist in perfection without this uninterrupted chain of Imamate. The deputies—proofs (hujja) and gate (bāb)—of the Imam are always aware of his presence and are witness to this uninterrupted chain.

Ismaili Muslims consider love and devotion for the living imam, his deputies, and his missionaries an integral part of the religion and classify it within the Seven Pillars of faith. The Imam's Teaching Hierarchy (hudud al-din), historically called da'wa in Arabic, is considered a sacred tenet because without his loyal Da'is the living imam would essentially be disconnected from his following.

The Ismailis record several periods in which generations of Imams lived a clandestine lifestyle resulting from political rivalry, religious persecution, and often both. When the Imam of the Time's guidance cannot be delivered publicly, his responsibilities are kept up through a staff of devotees acting as intermediaries between the Imam and his followers. Ismaili literature traditionally refers to these periods of time as eras of concealment, or dawr al-satr in Arabic.

According to Nasir al-Din Tusi, a Nizari Ismaili intellectual of the Alamut period, the Imams are the Possessors of the Command upon whom obedience is ordered by God in Sura an-Nisa, Ayah 59: "Obey God and obey the Messenger and the Possessors of the Command". An old command may be superseded by a newer one, and therefore those who hold to the command rather than the Commander, in the Ismaili view, may go astray. Through this framework, the Ismailis give primacy to the living Word, or the Imam of the Time, over the recorded word.

=== Leadership ===
The Imamat is an institution of welfare that is established through a covenant between an imam and his followers, whereby each assume rights and responsibilities. In the words of the former imam, Shah Karim al-Husayni Aga Khan IV, "the role of the Imam is to listen, not to talk; there's a big difference, in the sense that members of the community must inform me ... what is of concern to them." However serving and humble the Imam of the Time may be, in the eyes of his devotees he is spiritually revered as the asylum of the universe and a blessing worthy of protection and sacrifice.

The source of authority of the Imamat is interpreted by Ismaili Muslims as being explicitly stated within the Quran and they also believe the Quran alone provides its framework. In a sermon delivered during the reign of Al-Qa'im (Fatimid caliph) the rights and responsibilities between the Imam and his following are explained:

The Imam has not the option to reduce the rights of his flock, nor is the flock to decrease the rights of their Imam. Among the rights of the flock against their Imam is the maintaining of the Book of God and the Sunna of His Prophet, may God bless him and his family, and restitution from those who treat them unjustly for those so treated, and from the powerful among them for the weak, from the noble of them for the lowly, investigating their manner of life and the differing conditions of it, looking solicitously upon his dependants in his efforts, watching over them with his eye. For He, great and glorious is He, concerning what He praised of the character of His Prophet and His Messenger said: ‘There has come to you a messenger from among yourselves; a sorrow that befalls you grieves him; he is anxious concerning you; with the believers he is kind and compassionate’ [Q. 9: 128]. When he does that, the flock should revere him, honor him and extend assistance to him, standing prepared and ready, on behalf of what is right according to the book of God and the Sunna of His Prophet, may God bless him and his family.

Examples of recent developments initiated by the Imamat include the foubndation of several welfare and higher learning institutions; they exist within the framework of the Aga Khan Development Network, the Aga Khan University, and the Institute of Ismaili Studies.

==== Leader ====
Every Nizari Imam is considered to be a testament to God's spiritual presence among his people. When a descendant of the holy family is nominated as the "Imam" they become one essence with the divine and a living manifestation of the Quran. Each such designated (by nass) Imam receives the Nur (Light) of God as per the Quranic Ayat which asserts thus:

And We have vested everything in the manifest Imam. (Quran 36:12)

This Noor of God exists simultaneously in the present moment in the Almighty God's transcendental form as well as in the Nizari Imam's human form. Thus, when describing the essence of an Imam, the spiritual Nizari instructor of Rumi, the great Shams Tabrizi, wrote:

The meaning of the 'Book of God' is not the text (of the Quran); it is the Man who Guides. He is the 'Book of God'. He is its verses. He is scripture.

In a sermon delivered during the reign of Al-Qa'im (Fatimid caliph) the measure of obedience to the Imam is explained:

God said: 'O you who believe, obey God and obey the Messenger and those with authority among you' [Q. 4: 59 ]. Thus He makes obedience a duty, attaching it to obedience to the regulators of His affairs. They are the ones who uphold, on behalf of God, His truth and those who summon to him whoever desires to obey Him. He singled them out by the imamate, which is the highest of the ranks below prophecy. He prescribed for the servants rights due them and ordered them to fulfil these. He stipulated that they are connected to obeying him, doubling their reward on the measure of how well they follow those whose authority is ordained.

=== Administration ===
During the Fatimid rule of Egypt the affairs of state governance were a prominent occupation for the Ismaili Imams as the Fatimid Caliphs of Egypt. Aside from the governance of the Fatimid Empire there were also religious and spiritual affairs pertaining to the Fatimid Ismailis of the time who accepted the Fatimid Caliphs also as their spiritual Imams.

An institution of Ismaili Dawa (propagation of the Ismaili faith) was created by the Fatimid Imams and authority was delegated to Dais (spiritual teachers) for specific territories under the Fatimid Empire and even for territories beyond its borders to propagate Ismailism.

==== Seat of the Ismaili Imamat ====
In June 2015, the Ismaili Imamat and Portugal signed a landmark agreement for the establishment of a Seat of the Ismaili Imamat, which builds on earlier agreements accords. The agreement was unanimously ratified by the Parliament of the Portuguese Republic. Portugal’s Prime Minister, Pedro Passos Coelho, and other senior government officials witnessed the ceremony in Lisbon’s 18th century Palace of Necessidades, home of the Portuguese Foreign Ministry.

The Government of Portugal had invited the Ismaili Imamat to establish a Seat in Portugal, owing to the Imamat’s history, which goes back more than 1,400 years. In addition, the Ismaili Imamat and Aga Khan Development Network share a long history with Portugal to help improve the quality of life for people within Lusophone communities and around the world. Foreign Minister Machete praised the Agreement and referred to its significance in today’s world. "We consider this as an important sign by the Portuguese State towards an entity representing such an important community, at a time when intercultural and interfaith dialogue take on a role of capital importance in the major issues of the international agenda".

The Seat is based at the Mendonça Palace, a building from 1909, which is being restored by the Imamat.

In July 2018, His Highness Aga Khan IV officially designated the premises as the Seat of the Ismaili Imamat, and declared that it be known as the "Diwan of the Ismaili Imamat."

===== Delegations =====
Delegations of the Ismaili Imamat have been established in Lisbon, Portugal, and Ottawa, Canada.

== Textual basis ==
At al-Ghadir Khumm, by God's direct and emphatic command, Muhammad designated his cousin and son-in-law Ali—husband of his daughter Fatima az-Zahra—as his successor to his spiritual office as the first Imam in the continuing line of hereditary Imams and as his successor to his temporal office as the first Caliph of the entire Muslim ummah (community). Ali was then accepted as the successor to Mohammad's leadership at al-Ghadir Khumm by about 100,000 pilgrims on their return journey after participating in Muhammad's farewell pilgrimage, his last one before his death that same year.

At al-Ghadir Khumm, the most prominent and closest Companions of the Prophet (the Asaba) "gave their allegiance (bayah) personally to Ali under Muhammad's supervision." Among Muhammad's Companions were the first three Caliphs (the Rashidun Caliphs—i.e., the "Righteous Caliphs") Abu Bakr, Umar and Uthman who took Ali's hand in their own hands and publicly spoke their unstinted allegiance to serve him as their Imam and Caliph in the very same manner that all Muslims used to give their allegiance to Muhammad.

Numerous reliable hadith sources—both Shia and Sunni—record the event at Ghadir Khumm. They agree that Muhammad on his return journey from the final pilgrimage stopped at an oasis between Mecca and Medina known as Ghadir Khumm and addressed the large gathering of Muslims assembled there at his explicit command, even though it was excruciatingly hot that day, in order to hear God's special message to them (the people) according to God's message that Muhammad himself had received at Ghadir Khumm directly from God via the Quranic Ayat 5:67 thus:

"O Apostle: Deliver (to the people) what has been revealed to you from your Lord. And if you do not do so then you will not have delivered His Message (of Islam). And God will protect you from the people." —Quran 5:67.

Muhammad then asked the gathered Muslims whether he (Muhammad) had a greater claim upon them than they had even upon themselves. The Muslims responded that Muhammad had a greater claim upon them than they had even upon themselves. Muhammad then went on to say,

"God is my Master and I am the master of all the believers. He whose master I am, Ali is his master. He whose master I am, Ali is his master. He whose master I am, Ali is his master. (i.e., repeating it three times). O God, help whoever helps Ali, oppose whoever opposes Ali, support whoever supports Ali, forsake whoever forsakes Ali, and may the truth follow Ali wheresoever he turns. Ali, the son of Abu Talib, is my brother, my executor (Wasi), and my successor (Caliph), and the leader (Imam) after me."

The Shia Nizari Ismaili tradition bears witness to the continuity of the hereditary authority vested in the Imamim Mubeen (the Manifest Imam) at Ghadir Khumm by Muhammad and which has continued over 1,400 years from Ali to the present Imam-of-the-Time.

== History ==
The changing interpretations of the Quran by the Nizari Ismaili Imams to adapt to changing times creates tension between the Nizari Ismaili Imams and the Orthodox Ulema (Islamic scholars). The two most recent Nizari Ismaili Imams titled Aga Khan III and Aga Khan IV have replaced the obligation to perform the daily prayers from five times a day to three times a day by following the Quranic injunction rather than following Muhammad's custom (hadith and sunnah), in order to ease the religious pressures on the Muslim in the modern world. For example, they have dispensed with the veil for women and replaced it with dressing according to common decency in the country of one's residence:

"But purdah, as now known, itself did not exist till long after the Prophet’s death and is no part of Islam. The part played by Muslim women at Kardesiah and Yarmuk the two most momentous battles of Islam next to Badr and Honein, and their splendid nursing of the wounded after those battles, is of itself a proof to any reasonable person that purdah, as now understood, has never been conceived by the companions of the Prophet. That we Muslims should saddle ourselves with this excretion of Persian custom, borrowed by the Abbassides, is due to that ignorance of early Islam which is one of the most extraordinary of modern conditions." —Aga Khan III

Specifically, the Aga Khan IV has emphasised the ethics of pluralism, the cosmopolitan ethic of frontierless brotherhood and sisterhood, the forbearance from killing to settle disputes, governance by constitution and law, and the importance of keeping to the Islamic ethics practiced by Muhammad.

=== Schism ===
The Ismailis and the Twelvers split over the succession to Imam Ja'far al-Sadiq. Ismailis contend that Jafar had designated his son Isma'il ibn Jafar as his heir and the next Imam in the hereditary line and thus the Isma'ilis follow the Imamat of Isma'il and his progeny. Although Imam Ismail predeceased his father, he (i.e., Isma'il ibn Jafar) had in his own right designated his son Muhammad ibn Ismail as the next hereditary Imam who was to follow after him. In direct opposition to this belief, the Twelvers believe that Imam Ismail's younger brother Musa al Kadhim was from the beginning the rightful successor to Imam Jafar and that Ismail himself was never a contender.

The Nizari Ismailis have always maintained that the Imamate can only be inherited from the current Imam to a direct descendant in a father-to-son (or grandson) hereditary lineage starting with Imam Ali and then to Imam Hussein and so on until their present Imam.

The Nizari Ismailis diverge from the other Ismaili branches in regarding Hasan ibn Ali as a temporary or trustee Imam (imam al-mustawda) as opposed to a genuine or permanent Imam (imam al-mustaqarr), making thus his brother al-Husayn the second Imam.

== Sources ==
- Daftary, Farhad (2007). The Ismāʿı̄lı̄s: Their History and Doctrines (Second ed.). Cambridge: Cambridge University Press. ISBN 978-0-521-61636-2.
