= Progressive Dawoodi Bohra =

Reform movement within the Dawoodi Bohra subsect of Mustaali Ismai'li Shi'a Islam

Progressive Dawoodi Bohra also known as Bohra Youth is a reform movement within the Dawoodi Bohra subsect of Mustaali Ismai'li Shi'a Islam. They disagree with mainstream Dawoodi Bohra, as led by the incumbent Da'i al-Mutlaq, on doctrinal, economic, and social issues and broke off c. 1977.

The Progressive Dawoodi Bohra were led by Asghar Ali Engineer, until his death in 2013. Engineer had alleged that the 51st Da'i al-Mutlaq, Taher Saifuddin, claimed infallibility and issued new doctrines pronouncing that all properties owned by the Bohras (including mosques) belonged to the Syedna, and that they are mere munims (account keepers) on his behalf. Further, Saifuddin professed to have instituted a doctrine of Raza, which required that his followers do nothing (secular or religious, including namaz) without first attaining his permission. The policy of requiring a Raza began in 1902, when the 50th Da'i al-Mutlaq, Abdullah Badruddin, demanded that it be sought before construction of a secular school in Burhanpur could begin. Several Bohras challenged Badruddin's and then his successor Saifuddin's authority through litigation in Mumbai courts and the Syedna's claims were accepted by the judge.

== Beliefs and practices ==
The Progressives are subject to baraat, a form of excommunication that disallows other community members from speaking to them and bans them from mosques, and liken this situation to that of untouchables.

The Progressive Dawoodi Bohra community also claims that the 52nd Da'i Syedna Mohammad Burhanuddin asserted the same rights as Saifuddin. The ruling was appealed before the Rajasthan High Court at Jodhpur. Progressive Bohras claimed that the Waqf Act of 1954 provided exclusive control of property such as mosques to the Waqf Board, and that the Syedna had no rights over them.

== History of the Imāmī-Progressive Dawoodi Bohra ==
The historical emergence of the Progressive Dawoodi Bohras

The historical emergence of the Shī‘ah Imāmī Tāyyībī-Mustā‘lī Progressive Dawoodi-Ismā'īlīs

The schematic history of the development of the Imāmī-Mustā‘līan Progressive Dawoodi Bohra from other Shī‘ah Muslim sects

Wahb	Barrah	Fatimah	Abdul-Muttalib	Natīla
Aminah bint Wahab	ʿAbd Allāh	Asad ibn Hashim	Fatimah bint Qays	‘Abbas
Khadija bint Khuwaylid	Muhammad (Family tree)	Abi Talib	Fatimah bint Asad	ʿAbd Allāh
Fatima Zahra	Ali al Murtaza (Family tree)	Khawlah b. Ja'far al-Hanafiyyah	ʿAli bin ʿAbd Allāh b. ‘Abbas
Hasan al Mujtaba	Husayn ibn Ali (Family)	Shahr Banu	Ibn al-Hanifiyyah
Fatimah bint Hasan	Zayn al-'Abidin	Jayda al-Sindhi	Kaysanites (Al-Mukhtar)
Farwah bint Al-Qasim ibn Muhammad	Muhammad al-Baqir	Zayd ash-Shahīd (Zaydiyyah)	First Sufi; Abu Hashim (Hashimiyya)
Ja'far al-Sadiq	Yemen-Fivers	Zaydi-Alavids	Muhammad "al-Imām"
Isma'il ibn Jafar	Al-Aftah (Aftahiyya)	Al-Dibaj (Sumaytiyya)	Musa al-Kadhim	Ibrāhim ibn Ali ibn ′Abd Allah
Imāmī Ismā'īlīsm	Muhammad al-Aftah	Ibrāhim ibn Mūsā	Imāmī Athnā‘ashariyyah	Muslim’īyyah (Sīnbād)
Al-Maktūm (Mubārakʾiyya)	Seveners	Fātimā al-Ma‘sūmah	Ali al-Rida	Ishaq al-Turk
ʿAbadullāh (Wafī Aḥmad)	Ḥamdān Qarmaṭ'l-ʾAšʿaṯ	Al-Tustari (Taṣawwuf)	Muhammad al-Taqī (Jawad)	Muhammerah (Muqanna)
Aḥmad (Taqī Muhammad)	Abū Sa'id	Mūsā al-Mūbārraqā	Ali al Hadi	Khurrāmīyah (Pāpak, Maziar)
Ḥusayn (Raḍī ʿAbdillāh)	Abū-Tāhir	Muhammad ibn Ali al-Hadi	Hasan al-Askari	Kızılbaş
Ubayd Allāh (Fatimids)	Qarmatis	Nāimī-Ḥurūfīs	Ibn Nusayr (‘Ulyāʾiyya)
al-Qāʾim	ʿAlī Al-Aʿlā (Baktāsh’īyyah)	Muhammad (Imām Zāmān)	Al-Khaṣībī (Nusairis)
al-Manṣūr	Pasīkhānī (Nuktawiyya)	Imamiyyah (Twelvers)	Sarı Saltuk (Baktāshīs)
al-Muʿizz	Nasīmī	Ja'faris	Alevis	Otman Baba
al-ʿAzīz	Akhbaris	Shaykhis	Usulis	Balım Sultan
al-Ḥākim	Safavids (Safavī Iran)	Nuqta-yi Ula (Bábis)	Velayat-e-faqih (Iran, Islamic Rep.)	Gül Baba (Hurufi-Bektaşi)
al-Ẓāhir	Durzis (Al-Muqtana)	Mírzá Yaḥyá (Azalis)	Mírzá Ḥusayn (Baháʼís)	Other Alevis (Bektashism)
Al-Mustanṣir bi-Llāh	Dā'ī Nasir Khusraw	Badakhshan & Afgan Pamiris	Yarsanis (Sultan Sahak)
Al-Musta'li (Musta'lis)	Muḥammad ibn Abū Tamīm	Al-Nizār (Nizārīs)	Ostad Elahi (‘Ali-Ilahis)
Al-Āmir	Hashshashins (Ḥ. bin Sabbah)	Işık Alevis
At-Tayyib (Tayyibis)	Al-Ḥāfīz (Hafizis)	Ḥasan ʿAlā (Alamūt Nizārīs)	Alians (Demir Baba)	Harabatis (Baba Rexheb)
Arwa al-Sulayhi	Zoeb Musa (Dawoodis)	Agha Khans (Nizārī Ismā'īlīs)	Pamir Ismāʿīlīsm	Chepnis
Sulayman (Sulaymanis)	Ali bin Ibrāhim (Alavi Bohra)	Hebtiahs Bohra	A . Hussain Jivaji (Atba-i-Malak)
Jafari Bohras (Syed Jafar Ahmad Shirazi)	Progressive Dawoodis (Asghar Ali)	Atba-i-Malak Vakil (A. Qadir Ebrahimji)	Atba-i-Malak Badar (Ghulam Hussain Miya Khan)

== See also ==
- Alavi Bohra
- Atba-i-Malak
  - Atba-e-Malak Badar
  - Atba-i-Malak Vakil
- Dawoodi Bohra
- Hebtiahs Bohra
- Patani Bohras
- Sulaymani Bohra
- Sunni Bohra
