= Sulayman bin Hassan =

Bohra Muslim leader, namesake to the Sulaymani branch

Sulayman bin Hassan was the 27th Da'i al-Mutlaq of Ismailism according to the Sulaymanis. His claim to the position was contested, leading to a split in the Bohra community between the Sulyamanis, who accepted his claim, and the Dawoodi Bohras, who accepted Syedna Dawood Bin Qutubshah's claim instead.

The Sulaymanis believed he became a Da'i as per the "Nass" of Syedna Dawood Bin Ajabshah while those who did not accept this (primarily in India and elsewhere in Arab lands) were called Dawoodi Bohras.

He was born to Hasan bin Yusuf Najmuddin ibn Sulaiman and mother Zainab binte Moosa, niece of Syedna Yusuf on the 6th of Shawwal 961 AH, 13 September 1554 AD, in Qasr-e-Sa'daan, Qila-e-Tayba of Qabeela-e-Hamadaan, the city of Sana'a in Today's north Yemen.

== Syedna Malik Sulayman ji bin Hassan in the history of the Imāmī-Tāyyībī-Mustā‘līan Makramis ==
The historical emergence of Makramis under Sulayman

The historical emergence of the Shī‘ah Imāmī Tāyyībī-Mustā‘līan-Makramis under Da'i al-Mutlaq Sulayman bin Hassan

The schematic history of the development of the Ismā'īlī-Imāmī-Mustā‘lī-Makramis under
the authority of Da'i al-Mutlaq Sulayman bin Hassan from other Shī‘ah Muslim sects

Wahb	Barrah	Fatimah	Abdul-Muttalib	Natīla
Aminah bint Wahab	ʿAbd Allāh	Asad ibn Hashim	Fatimah bint Qays	‘Abbas
Khadija bint Khuwaylid	Muhammad (Family tree)	Abi Talib	Fatimah bint Asad	ʿAbd Allāh
Fatima Zahra	Ali al Murtaza (Family tree)	Khawlah b. Ja'far al-Hanafiyyah	ʿAli bin ʿAbd Allāh b. ‘Abbas
Hasan al Mujtaba	Husayn ibn Ali (Family)	Shahrbanu bint Yazdegerd III	Ibn al-Hanifiyyah
Fatimah bint Hasan	Zayn al-'Abidin	Jayda al-Sindhi	Kaysanites (Al-Mukhtar)
Farwah bint Al-Qasim ibn Muhammad	Muhammad al-Baqir	Zayd ash-Shahīd (Zaydiyyah)	First Sufi; Abu Hashim (Hashimiyya)
Ja'far al-Sadiq	Yemen-Fivers	Zaydi-Alavids	Muhammad "al-Imām"
Isma'il ibn Jafar	Al-Aftah (Aftahiyya)	Al-Dibaj (Sumaytiyya)	Musa al-Kadhim	Ibrāhim ibn Ali ibn ′Abd Allah
Imāmī Ismā'īlīsm	Muhammad al-Aftah	Ibrāhim ibn Mūsā	Imāmī Athnā‘ashariyyah	Muslim’īyyah (Sīnbād)
Al-Maktūm (Mubārakʾiyya)	Seveners	Fātimā al-Ma‘sūmah	Ali al-Rida	Ishaq al-Turk
ʿAbadullāh (Wafī Aḥmad)	Ḥamdān Qarmaṭ'l-ʾAšʿaṯ	Al-Tustari (Taṣawwuf)	Muhammad al-Taqī (Jawad)	Muhammerah (Muqanna)
Aḥmad (Taqī Muhammad)	Abū Sa'id	Mūsā al-Mūbārraqā	Ali al Hadi	Khurrāmīyah (Pāpak, Maziar)
Ḥusayn (Raḍī ʿAbdillāh)	Abū-Tāhir	Muhammad ibn Ali al-Hadi	Hasan al-Askari	Kızılbaş
Abd Allāh (Fatimids)	Qarmatis	Nāimī-Ḥurūfīs	Ibn Nusayr (‘Ulyāʾiyya)
al-Qāʾim	ʿAlī Al-Aʿlā (Baktāsh’īyyah)	Muhammad (Imām Zāmān)	Al-Khaṣībī (Nusairis)
al-Manṣūr	Pasīkhānī (Nuktawiyya)	Imamiyyah (Twelvers)	Sarı Saltuk (Baktāshīs)
al-Muʿizz	Nasīmī	Ja'faris	Alevis	Otman Baba
al-ʿAzīz	Akhbaris	Shaykhis	Usulis	Balım Sultan
al-Ḥākim	Safavids (Safavī Iran)	Nuqta-yi Ula (Bábis)	Velayat-e-faqih (Iran, Islamic Rep.)	Gül Baba (Hurufi-Bektaşi)
al-Ẓāhir	Durzis (Al-Muqtana)	Mírzá Yaḥyá (Azalis)	Mírzá Ḥusayn (Baháʼís)	Other Alevis (Bektashism)
Al-Mustanṣir bi-Llāh	Dā'ī Nasir Khusraw	Badakhshan & Afgan Pamiris	Yarsanis (Sultan Sahak)
Al-Musta'li (Musta'lis)	Muḥammad ibn Abū Tamīm	Al-Nizār (Nizārīs)	Ostad Elahi (‘Ali-Ilahis)
Al-Āmir	Hashshashins (Ḥ. bin Sabbah)	Işık Alevis
At-Tayyib (Tayyibis)	Al-Ḥāfīz (Hafizis)	Ḥasan ʿAlā (Alamūt Nizārīs)	Alians (Demir Baba)	Harabatis (Baba Rexheb)
Arwa al-Sulayhi	Zoeb Mūsā (Dawoodis)	Agha Khans (Nizārī Ismā'īlīs)	Pamir Ismāʿīlīsm	Chepnis
Sulayman (Sulaymanis)	Ali bin Ibrāhim (Alavi Bohra)	Hebtiahs Bohra	A . Hussain Jivaji (Atba-i-Malak)
Jafari Bohras (Syed Jafar Ahmad Shirazi)	Progressive Dawoodis (Asghar Ali)	Atba-i-Malak Vakil (A. Qadir Ebrahimji)	Atba-i-Malak Badar (Ghulam Hussain Miya Khan)
