= Hebtiahs Bohra =

Branch of Mustaali Ismaili Shi'a Islam

The Hebtiahs Bohra were a branch of Mustaali Ismaili Shi'a Islam that broke off from the mainstream Dawoodi Bohra after the death of the 39th Da'i al-Mutlaq in 1754. They were mostly concentrated in Ujjain in India with a few families who were Hebtiah Bohra.

== History of the Imāmī-Hebtiahs Bohra ==
The historical emergence of the Hebatiah Bohras

The historical emergence of the Shī‘ah Imāmī Tāyyībī-Mustā‘lī Hebtiahs-Ismā'īlīs

The schematic history of the development of the Imāmī-Mustā‘līan Hebtiahs Bohra from other Shī‘ah Muslim sects

Wahb	Barrah	Fatimah	Abdul-Muttalib	Natīla
Aminah bint Wahab	ʿAbd Allāh	Asad ibn Hashim	Fatimah bint Qays	'Abbas
Khadija bint Khuwaylid	Muhammad (Family tree)	Abi Talib	Fatimah bint Asad	ʿAbd Allāh
Fatima Zahra	Ali al Murtaza (Family tree)	Khawlah b. Ja'far al-Hanafiyyah	ʿAli bin ʿAbd Allāh b. 'Abbas
Hasan al Mujtaba	Husayn ibn Ali (Family)	Shahr Banu	Ibn al-Hanifiyyah
Fatimah bint Hasan	Zayn al-'Abidin	Jayda al-Sindhi	Kaysanites (Al-Mukhtar)
Farwah bint Al-Qasim ibn Muhammad	Muhammad al-Baqir	Zayd ash-Shahīd (Zaydiyyah)	First Sufi; Abu Hashim (Hashimiyya)
Ja'far al-Sadiq	Yemen-Fivers	Zaydi-Alavids	Muhammad "al-Imām"
Isma'il ibn Jafar	Al-Aftah (Aftahiyya)	Al-Dibaj (Sumaytiyya)	Musa al-Kadhim	Ibrāhim ibn Ali ibn 'Abd Allah
Imāmī Ismā'īlīsm	Muhammad al-Aftah	Ibrāhim ibn Mūsā	Imāmī Athnā‘ashariyyah	Muslim’īyyah (Sīnbād)
Al-Maktūm (Mubārakʾiyya)	Seveners	Fātimā al-Ma‘sūmah	Ali al-Rida	Ishaq al-Turk
ʿAbadullāh (Wafī Aḥmad)	Ḥamdān Qarmaṭ'l-ʾAšʿaṯ	Al-Tustari (Taṣawwuf)	Muhammad al-Taqī (Jawad)	Muhammerah (Muqanna)
Aḥmad (Taqī Muhammad)	Abū Sa'id	Mūsā al-Mūbārraqā	Ali al Hadi	Khurrāmīyah (Pāpak, Maziar)
Ḥusayn (Raḍī ʿAbdillāh)	Abū-Tāhir	Muhammad ibn Ali al-Hadi	Hasan al-Askari	Kızılbaş
Ubayd Allāh (Fatimids)	Qarmatis	Nāimī-Ḥurūfīs	Ibn Nusayr ('Ulyāʾiyya)
al-Qāʾim	ʿAlī Al-Aʿlā (Baktāsh’īyyah)	Muhammad (Imām Zāmān)	Al-Khaṣībī (Nusairis)
al-Manṣūr	Pasīkhānī (Nuktawiyya)	Imamiyyah (Twelvers)	Sarı Saltuk (Baktāshīs)
al-Muʿizz	Nasīmī	Ja'faris	Alevis	Otman Baba
al-ʿAzīz	Akhbaris	Shaykhis	Usulis	Balım Sultan
al-Ḥākim	Safavids (Safavī Iran)	Nuqta-yi Ula (Bábis)	Velayat-e-faqih (Iran, Islamic Rep.)	Gül Baba (Hurufi-Bektaşi)
al-Ẓāhir	Durzis (Al-Muqtana)	Mírzá Yaḥyá (Azalis)	Mírzá Ḥusayn (Baháʼís)	Other Alevis (Bektashism)
Al-Mustanṣir bi-Llāh	Dā'ī Nasir Khusraw	Badakhshan & Afgan Pamiris	Yarsanis (Sultan Sahak)
Al-Musta'li (Musta'lis)	Muḥammad ibn Abū Tamīm	Al-Nizār (Nizārīs)	Ostad Elahi ('Ali-Ilahis)
Al-Āmir	Hashshashins (Ḥ. bin Sabbah)	Işık Alevis
At-Tayyib (Tayyibis)	Al-Ḥāfīz (Hafizis)	Ḥasan ʿAlā (Alamūt Nizārīs)	Alians (Demir Baba)	Harabatis (Baba Rexheb)
Arwa al-Sulayhi	Zoeb Musa (Dawoodis)	Agha Khans (Nizārī Ismā'īlīs)	Pamir Ismāʿīlīsm	Chepnis
Sulayman (Sulaymanis)	Ali bin Ibrāhim (Alavi Bohra)	Hebtiahs Bohra	A . Hussain Jivaji (Atba-i-Malak)
Jafari Bohras (Syed Jafar Ahmad Shirazi)	Progressive Dawoodis (Asghar Ali)	Atba-i-Malak Vakil (A. Qadir Ebrahimji)	Atba-i-Malak Badar (Ghulam Hussain Miya Khan)

== See also ==
- Alavi Bohra
- Atba-i-Malak
- Atba-e-Malak Badar
- Atba-i-Malak Vakil
- Dawoodi Bohra
- Progressive Dawoodi Bohra
- Patani Bohras
- Sulaymani Bohra
- Sunni Bohra
