= Tayyebhai Razzak =

Moulana Tayyeb Saheb is the Imam or current spiritual head of the Atba-e-Malak Vakil group of Mustaali Ismaili Shi'a Islam.
