= Tayyibi Isma'ilism =

Sect of Shīa Islam

Tayyibi Isma'ilism (Arabic: الطيبية, romanized: al-Ṭayyibiyya) is the only surviving sect of the Musta'li branch of Isma'ilism, the other being the extinct Hafizi branch. Followers of Tayyibi Isma'ilism are found in various Bohra communities: Dawoodi, Sulaymani, and Alavi.

The Tayyibi originally split from the Fatimid Caliphate-supporting Hafizi branch by supporting the right of Abu'l-Qasim al-Tayyib to the Imamate.

== History ==
Upon the death of the twentieth Imam, al-Amir bi-Ahkam Allah (d. 524 AH (1129/1130CE)), his new born child Abu'l-Qasim al-Tayyib (b. 524 AH (1129/1130CE)) was appointed the twenty-first Imam. As he was not in a position to run the Dawah, the Queen Arwa al-Sulayhi, his Hujjah or proof, established the office of the Da'i al-Mutlaq, who acted on his behalf. The Da'i al-Mutlaq had now been given absolute authority and made independent from political activity.

=== Da'i al-Mutlaq Dhu'ayb ibn Musa ===
Da'i al-Mutlaq Zoeb bin Moosa used to live in and died in Huth, Yemen. His ma'zoon ("associate") was Khattab bin Hasan. After the death of Abdullah, Zoeb bin Moosa appointed Yaqub as the wali ("representative" or "caretaker") of the Tayyibi organisation ("dawah") in India. Yaqub was the first person of Indian origin to receive this honor. He was the son of Bharmal, minister of the Chaulukya king Jayasimha Siddharaja. Fakhruddin, son of Tarmal also another minister, was sent to western Rajasthan. One Da'i al mutlaq after another continued until the twenty-fourth Da'i al mutlaq, Yusuf Najmuddin ibn Sulaiman, in Yemen. Due to persecution by the local Zaidi ruler, the dawah then shifted to India under the twenty-fifth Da'i al mutlaq, Syedna Jalal Shamsuddin bin Hasan in 1567.

=== Sulaymani-Dawoodi-Alavi split ===
In 1592, the Tayyibi broke into two factions in a dispute over who should become the twenty-seventh Da'i al mutlaq: Dawood Bin Qutubshah or Sulayman bin Hassan. The followers of the former, primarily in India, became the Dawoodi Bohra, the latter the Sulaymani of Yemen. In 1621, the Alavi Bohra split from the Dawoodi Bohra community.

There is also a community of Sunni Bohra in India. In the fifteenth century, there was a schism in the Bohra community of Patan in Gujarat as a large number converted from Mustaali Ismaili Shia Islam to mainstream Hanafi Sunni Islam. The leader of this conversion movement to Sunni was Syed Jafar Ahmad Shirazi who also had the support of the governor of Gujarat. Thus this new group is known as Jafari Bohras, Patani Bohras or Sunni Bohra. Syed Jafar Ahmad Shirazi convinced the Patani Bohras to cease social relations with Ismaili Bohras. The cumulative results of these pressures resulted in a large number of Bohras converting from Shia Ismaili fiqh to Sunni Hanafi fiqh.

The Hebtiahs Bohra was a branch of Mustaali Ismaili Shi'a Islam that broke off from the mainstream Dawoodi Bohra after the death of the 39th Da'i al-Mutlaq in 1754. The Atba-e-Malak community are a branch of Mustaali Ismaili Shi'a Islam that broke off from the mainstream Dawoodi Bohra after the death of the 46th Da'i al-Mutlaq, under the leadership of Abdul Hussain Jivaji in 1840. They have further split into two more branches, the Atba-e-Malak Badar and Atba-e-Malak Vakil. The Progressive Dawoodi Bohra is a reformist sect within Mustaali Ismai'li Shi'a Islam that broke off circa 1977. They disagree with mainstream Dawoodi Bohra, as led by the Da'i al-Mutlaq, on doctrinal, economic and social issues.

At present, the largest Tayyibi faction/sub-sect is the Dawoodi Bohra, whose current leader is Syedna Mufaddal Saifuddin. Taher Fakhruddin is also a claimant to the title of Dai al Mutlaq since 2016, although it is widely accepted that Syedna Mufaddal Saifuddin is the leader of the Dawoodi Bohras, in all aspects and administration.

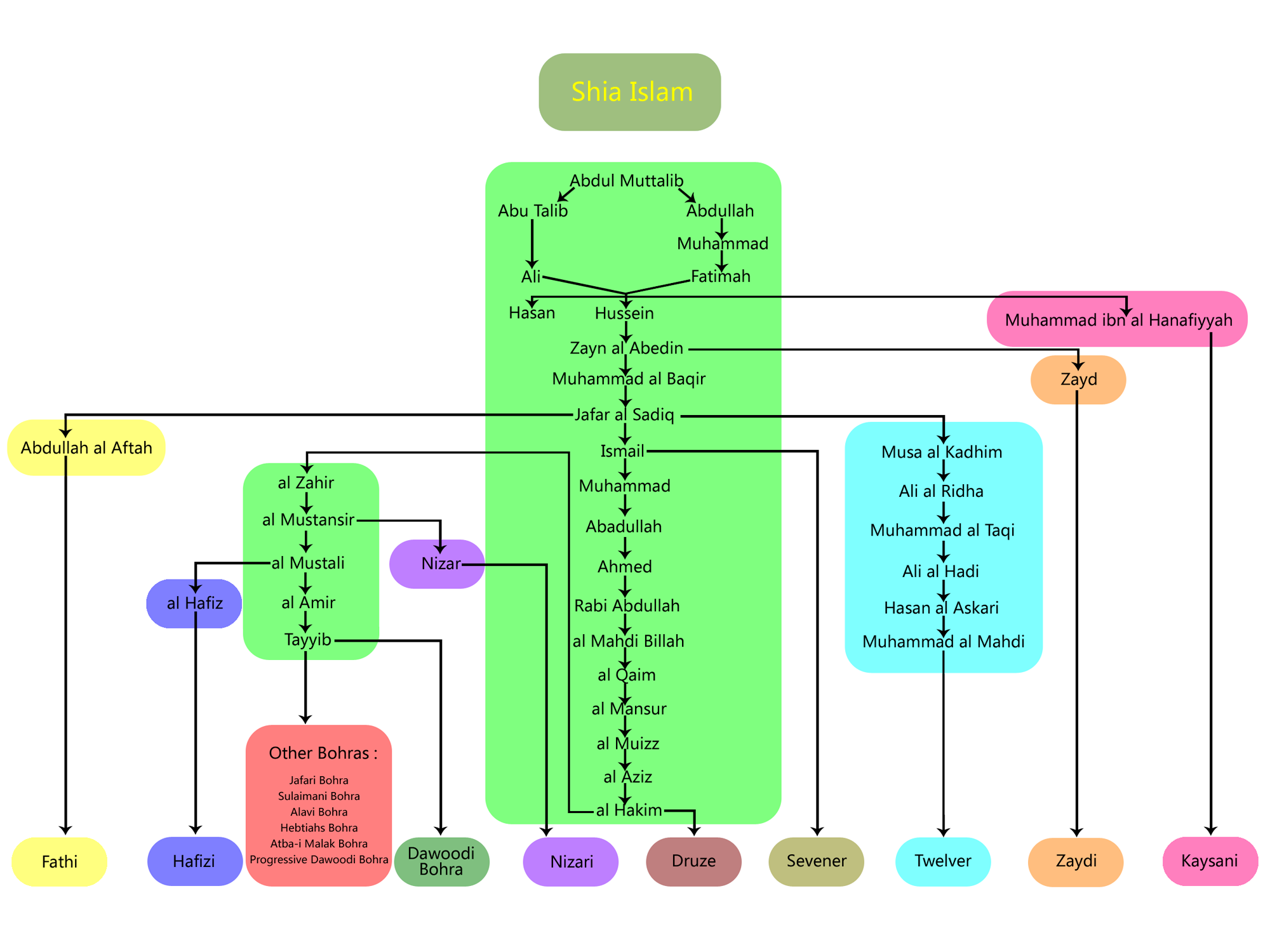
Note: Kaysani's Imam Hanafiyyah is descendant of Ali from Ali's wife Khawlah
