= Da'i al-Mutlaq =

Islamic religious leader

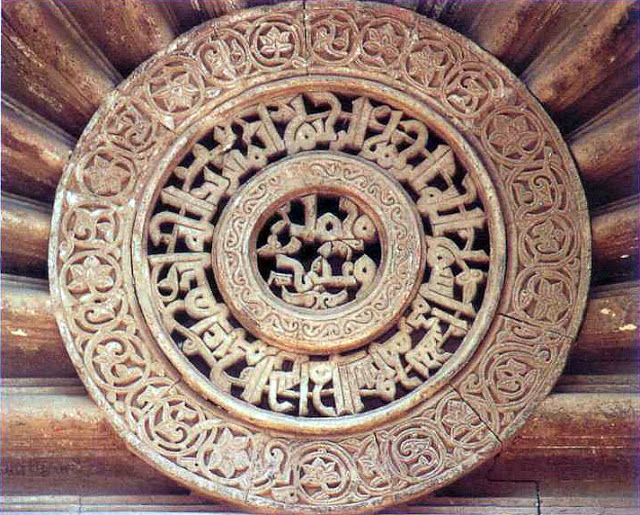
The Qur'anic verse 33:33 inscribed at Al-Aqmar Mosque signifying the purity of Ahl al-Bayt [and their Du'at].

Da'i al-Mutlaq (Arabic: داعي المطلق, romanized: Dā'ī al-Mutlaq, lit. 'absolute, unrestricted, or missionary'; pl. دعاة مطلقون, Du'āt Mutlaqin) is the most senior spiritual rank and office in Tayyibi Isma'ilism. The Da'i al-Mutlaq has headed the Tayyibi community since the seclusion of the 21st Tayyibi Imam, at-Tayyib Abu'l-Qasim, traditionally placed in 528 AH/1134 AD.

According to Tayyibi Isma'ili tradition, in the Imam's absence, the Da'i al-Mutlaq is the faith's highest authority; i.e., the Da'i al-Mutlaq holds the same authority as the Imam. Before the seclusion of al-Tayyib, the Da'i al-Mutlaq operated under the direct orders of the Imam and his trusted associates in regions where Isma'ili faithful were present, either living openly propounding their faith, or secretly due to fear of persecution.

In Yemen, after the 21st Tayyibi Imam went into seclusion, the Da'i was given the authority of Itlaaq (إطلاق), or free conduct, and absolute religious and social authority, under the governing principles of the Tayyibi Isma'ili faith. His command is regarded as a final decree and his conduct infallible due to the divine support (Ta’yeed) he receives from the Imam. Unlike the Imam, who appoints a successor only from his lineal biological sons, the Da'i can appoint any believer as his successor when he is commanded to do so by Ta’yeed of the Imam.

== History ==
According to Ismā'īlī [Musta'ali Tayyabī] tradition, before the 21st Fatimid [Musta'ali] Imam, Taiyab abi al-Qasim went into state of occultation from Cairo in 528 AH/1134 AD, his father, the 20th Imām al-Amīr had instructed Queen Arwa al-Sulayhi/Al-Hurra Al-Malika in Yemen to anoint a vicegerent after the occultation of his son al-Tayyib Abu'l-Qasim. Queen Arwa trained and appointed Syedna Zoeb bin Moosa as the first Da'i al-Mutlaq.

Dawat-e-Hadiyah Act 1993
- Act of Parliament
- Parliament of the United Kingdom
- Long title: An Act to incorporate the Dai al-Mutlaq as a corporation sole; and for related purposes.
- Citation: 1993 c. x

Dates
- Royal assent: 1 July 1993

Status: Current legislation

Text of the Dawat-e-Hadiyah Act 1993 as in force today (including any amendments) within the United Kingdom, from legislation.gov.uk.

=== Tradition of Nass governing the Appointment of Saheb-i-Amar ===
Nass-نص is the basis of Shia beliefs, it ensures the succession (Silsila). It is a declaration and designation through divine indication and Allah’s spiritual intervention-تأئید إلھي for the appointment of a successor-منصوص, be it an Imam or (during the Imam’s concealment) a Dai-داعي by his incumbent appointer-ناص among the faithful, publicly-نص جلي or privately نص خفي and at times supported by written documentary orders-سجل شریف. The one who appoints is called Naas and the one appointed is called Mansoos.

The tradition stems from the events of Ghadir Khum where Mohammad appointed his son-in-law, cousin and his heir 'Ali bin Abi Taalib as his Vicegerent, legatee and Wali of the Faithful. This tradition continued through all the Tayyibi-Ismaili Imams and Du'aat; according to Tayyibi-Ismaili belief, neither Imam nor Da'i al-Mutlaq can pass away without appointing his successor.

== Deputies ==
The Da'i al-Mutlaq has the authority (but not obligation) to appoint an individual to each of two ranks: Mazoon al-Da'wat and Mukasir al-Da'wat.

=== Mazoon al-Da'wat ===
- مأذون الدعوة - Mazoon al-Da'wat, Mazoon e Dawat: The Licentiate, Authoritative Rank, the most trusted associate in Da’wah ranks whose traditional role includes taking Bay'at from his subjects by the orders of Da’i al-Mutlaq. He is on a Spiritual Rank in the Isma’ili Taiyebi Da’wah hierarchy immediately below the authority of Da’i and sits to his right, and who carries out the religious activities as per the regulations of Da’wah organization. The religious doctrine specifies that he invariably and always assists and obeys his superior and his Master, the Da’i al-Mutlaq. In the absence of the Da’i he acts as his legatee. The Da'i al-Mutlaq's successor is often appointed to the rank of Mazoon; however, this is not the rule and the Da'i's successor has often been someone other than the Mazoon. Upon the death of the Mazoon, the Da'i selects a new trusted associate to fill the position.

=== Mukaasir al-Da'wat ===
- مکاسر الدعوة - Mukaasir al-Da'wat, Mukaasir e Dawat - The second deputy rank to the Da'i proscribed in Isma’ili Taiyebism. He sits to the right of the Mazoon during religious gatherings (Majalis). In the absence of both the Da'i and Mazoon, the Mukaasir acts as their legatee. Upon the death of the Mukaasir, the Da'i selects a new trusted associate to fill the position.

== Incumbents ==
Since the establishment of the office of Da'i al-Mutlaq following the death of the Fatimid Caliph-Imam Mansur al-Amir Bi-Ahkamillah, there have been several disputes over the succession to the office, leading to a number of extant sects, each with their own incumbent to the office.

=== Dawoodi Bohras ===
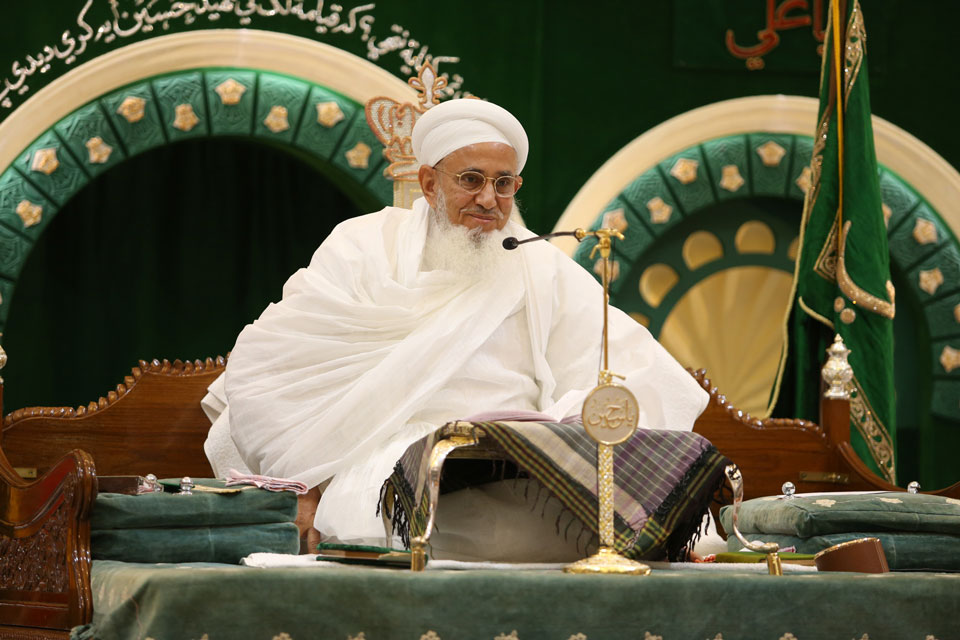
Syedna Mufaddal Saifuddin, recognized by most Dawoodi Bohras as the 53rd Da'i al-Mutlaq

The Dawoodi Bohras are the largest community of Tayyibi Ismailis, who followed Dawood Bin Qutubshah Burhan al-Din II as the successor to Da'ud Burhan al-Din I, thus deriving their name from him.

Within the Dawoodi Bohras, the current Da'i al-Mutlaq is Syedna Mufaddal Saifuddin. The previous Da'i was Syedna Mohammed Burhanuddin, who died in January 2014. The vast majority of Dawoodi Bohras recognize Saifuddin as the 53rd incumbent.

The current seat of the Dawoodi Bohra Da'i is at Saify Mahal on Malabar Hill in Mumbai, India.

=== Alavi Bohras ===
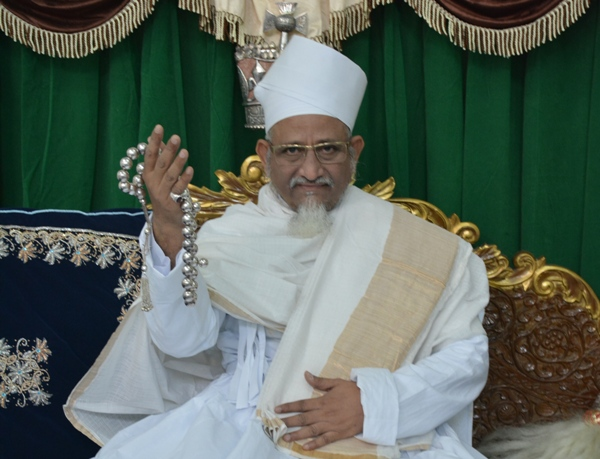
Syedna Haatim Zakiyuddin, recognized by Alavi Bohras as the 45th Da'i al-Mutlaq

The Alavi Bohras are a smaller group of Tayyibi Ismailis, who followed Ali Shams al-Din V as the successor to Sheikh Adam Safiuddin, thus deriving their name from him.

The Alavi Bohras use the title of Dai al-Mutlaq in its Persian form "Da'i-e-Mutlaq". The current incumbent is Haatim Zakiyuddin, who succeeded his father Abu Hatim Tayyib Ziyauddin in 2015.

The current seat of the Alavi Bohra Da'i is in Vadodara, India.

=== Sulaymanis ===
The Sulaymanis are a smaller group of Tayyibi Ismailis, who followed Sulayman bin Hassan as the successor to Da'ud Burhan al-Din, thus deriving their name from him.

Starting from 1677, Sulayman's successors almost always came from the Makrami family. The Sulaymani Du'at made Najran their headquarters and ruled the area, supported by the Banu Yam, until their power waned under the successive rules of the Ottomans and Saudis.

The current seat of the Sulaymani Da'i is in Najran, Saudi Arabia, the current incumbent is Sayyidna Ali bin Hāsin al-Makrami.

=== Atba-e-Malak Badar ===
The Atba-i-Malak community are a branch of Musta'ali Isma'ili Shi'a Islam that broke off from the mainstream Dawoodi Bohra after the death of the 46th Da'i al-Mutlaq, under the leadership of Abdul Hussain Jivaji in 1840. They have further split into two more branches. The Atba-e-Malak Badar is a branch of Atba-e-Malak Mustaali Ismaili Shi'a Islam. They follow the preachings of both Abdul Hussein Jivaji and Badruddin Ghulam Hussain Miya Khan Saheb who was appointed as Hijab (Veil) of Moulana Malak (Abdul Hussein Jivaji) Saheb. The current leader or Dai al Mutlaq is Maulana Muhammad Amiruddin Malak Saheb. The Atba-i-Malak Badar community was founded in 1899AD and is based in Mahdibagh, Nagpur in India.

=== Atba-e-Malak Vakil ===
The Atba-e-Malak Vakil continues the tradition of Nass after the untimely demise of the 46th Da'i al-Mutlaq Syedna Mohammad Badruddin saheb. The Amar passes on to four Mumalikin saheb (hidden successors - the seclusion was necessary to guard the Amar in then difficult times), last one being Moulana Adamji Tayyebji saheb in Mumbai followed by Moulana Malak (Abdul Hussein Jivaji) saheb who appointed Moulana Abdul Qadir Ebrahimji saheb as his Mansoos (successor) or Vakil (the one who advocates his succession or roots / acts for his principal) that identifies his followers as Atba-e-Malak Vakil. Their current spiritual lord / Imam is Moulana Tayyeb saheb bin Moulana Razzak saheb. This is a very small and peaceful community with high moral and ethical values, the majority of its population is in Nagpur in India with the second largest population is in Mumbai. Qur'an and Nasihat (Scriptures written by Syedi Sadiqali during the period of 42nd Da'i al-Mutlaq Syedna Yusuf Najmuddin saheb and 44th Da'i al-Mutlaq Syedna Mohammed Ezzuddin saheb) are main religious scriptures of Atba-e-Malak Vakil sect.

=== Qutbi Bohra ===
Taher Fakhruddin is the 54th Da'i al-Mutlaq of the Qutbi Bohras, a sect within Shia Islam. The current seat of the Qutbi Bohras is in Thane, Maharashtra.

== See also ==
- List of Dai of Dawoodi Bohra
- Alavi Bohras
