= Musta'li Ismailism =

Sect of Isma'ilism

Musta'li Isma'ilism (Arabic: المستعلية, romanized: al-Mustaʿliyya) is a branch of Isma'ilism named for their acceptance of al-Musta'li as the legitimate ninth Fatimid caliph and legitimate successor to his father, al-Mustansir Billah (r. 1036–1094/1095). The Nizari the other living branch of Ismailism, led by Aga Khan V believe the ninth caliph was al-Musta'li's elder brother, Nizar.

The Musta'li originated in Fatimid-ruled Egypt, later moved its religious center to Yemen, and gained a foothold in 11th-century Western India through missionaries.

== The Tayyibi and the Hafizi ==
Historically, there was a distinction between the Tayyibi and the Hafizi Musta'lis, the former recognising Abu'l-Qasim al-Tayyib as the legitimate heir of the Imamate after al-Amir bi-Ahkam Allah and the latter following al-Hafiz, who was enthroned as caliph. The Hafizi view lost all support following the downfall of the Fatimid Caliphate: later Musta'lis are all Tayyibi.

Syedna Mohammed Burhanuddin was the 52nd Da'i al-Mutlaq of the Dawoodi Bohra community. After he died in 2014 Syedna Mufaddal Saifuddin succeeded him, as the 53rd Da'i al-Mutlaq of The Dawoodi Bohra community.

== History ==
According to Musta'lī tradition, after the death of al-Amir bi-Ahkam Allah, his infant son, Abu'l-Qasim al-Tayyib, about two years old, was protected by Arwa al-Sulayhi who died in 1138, wife of the chief Fatimid Da'i of Yemen. She had been promoted to the post of Hujjat al-Islam long before by al-Mustansir Billah when her husband died and ran the Fatimid dawah from Yemen in the name of Imam Abu'l-Qasim al-Tayyib. During her leadership Abu'l-Qasim al-Tayyib went into occultation so she instituted the office of Da'i al-Mutlaq. Zoeb bin Moosa was first to be instituted to this office and the line of Tayyibi Da'is that began in 1132. Arwa al-Sulayhi was the Hujjah in Yemen from the time of Imam Al-Mustansir Billah. She appointed the Da'i in Yemen to run religious affairs. Isma'ili missionaries Ahmed and Abdullah (in about 1067 AD (460 AH)) were also sent to India in that time. They sent Syedi Nuruddin to Dongaon to look after southern part and Syedi Fakhruddin to East Rajasthan, India.

=== Branches ===
- There is also a community of Sunni Bohra in India. In the fifteenth century, there was schism in the Bohra community of Patan in Gujarat as a large number converted from Musta'li Isma'ili Shia Islam to mainstream Hanafi Sunni Islam. The leader of this conversion movement to Sunni was Syed Jafar Ahmad Shirazi who also had the support of the Mughal governor of Gujarat.
- In 1592, a leadership struggle caused the Ṭayyibi Ismailis to split. Following the death of the 26th Dai in 1591 CE, Sulayman bin Hassan, the grandson of the 24th Dai, was wali in Yemen and claimed the succession, supported by a few Bohras from Yemen and India. However, most Bohras denied his claim of nass, declaring that the supporting document evidence was forged. The two factions separated, with the followers of Suleman Bin Hasan becoming the Sulaymanis named after Sulayman ibn Hassan and mainly located in Yemen and Saudi Arabia, and the followers of Syedna Dawood Bin Qutubshah becoming the Dawoodi Bohra. Dawoodi Bohra, found mostly in the Indian subcontinent.
- A split in 1637 from the Dawoodi Bohra resulted in the Alavi Bohra.
- The Hebtiahs Bohra are a branch of Musta'li Isma'ili Shi'a Islam that broke off from the mainstream Dawoodi Bohra after the death of the 39th Da'i al-Mutlaq in 1754.
- The Atba-e-Malak community are a branch of Musta'ali Isma'ili Shi'a Islam that broke off from the mainstream Dawoodi Bohra after the death of the 46th Da'i al-Mutlaq, under the leadership of Abdul Hussain Jivaji in 1840. They have further split into two more branches:
  - Atba-e-Malak Badar – The current leader is Maulana Muhammad Amiruddin Malak Saheb.
  - Atba-e-Malak Vakil – Their current leader is Tayyebhai Razzak.
- The Progressive Dawoodi Bohra is a reformist sect within Musta'li Ismai'li Shi'a Islam that broke off circa 1977. They disagree with mainstream Dawoodi Bohra, as led by the Da'i al-Mutlaq, on doctrinal, economic, and social issues.
- In 2014, following the death of Mohammed Burhanuddin, there was a succession dispute. Syedna Mufaddal Saifuddin was established as the 53rd Da'i al-Mutlaq by his father, His Holiness Syedna Mohammad Burhanuddin. However, the Qutbi Bohra branch broke off from the original Dawoodi Bohra. This dispute was taken to the courts by the Qutbi Bohra, which denounced their claims as false, affirming Syedna Mufaddal Saifuddin as the rightful 53rd Da'i al-Mutlaq.

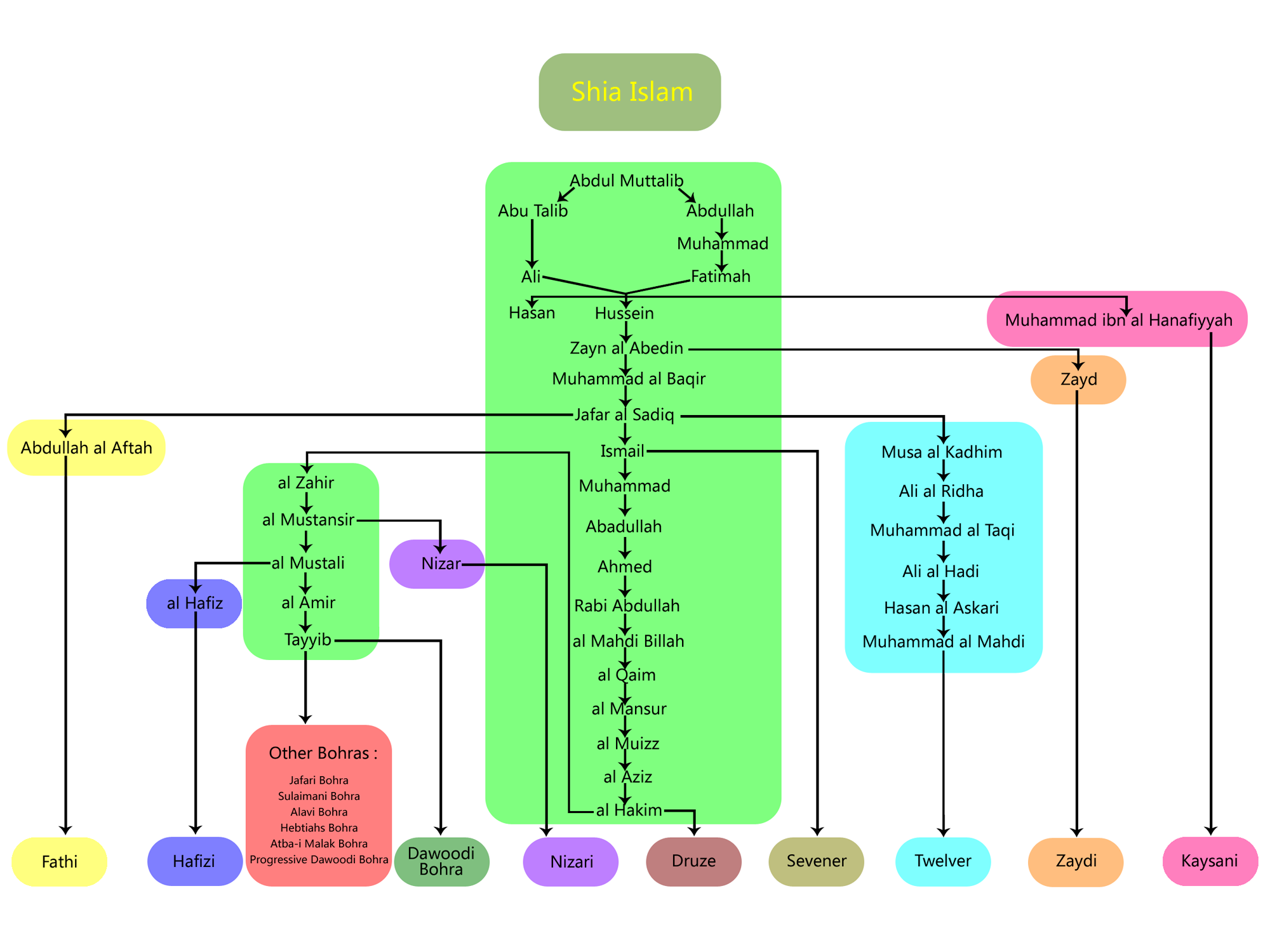
Note: Kaysani's Imam Hanafiyyah is descendant of Ali from Ali's wife Khawlah

== Musta'li Imams ==
1. Hasan ibn Ali (R.A) 625–670 (imam 660–670)
2. Husayn ibn Ali 626–680 (imam 670–680 )
3. Ali al-Sajjad 659–712 (imam 680–712)
4. Muhammad al-Baqir 676–743 (imam 712–743)
5. Ja'far al-Sadiq 702–765 (imam 743–765)
6. Isma'il al-Mubarak 719/722–775 (imam 765–775)
7. Muhammad ibn Isma'il 740–813 (imam 775–813)
8. Abadullah ibn Muhammad (Ahmad al-Wafi) 766–829 (imam 813–829)
9. Ahmad ibn Abadullah (Muhammad at-Taqi) 790–840 (imam 829–840)
10. Husayn ibn Ahmad (Radi Abdullah) (imam 840–909)
11. Abdallah al-Mahdi Billah (909–934)
12. al-Qa'im bi-Amr Allah (934–946)
13. al-Mansur bi-Nasr Allah (946–953)
14. al-Mu'izz li-Din Allah (953–975)
15. al-Aziz Billah (975–996)
16. al-Hakim bi-Amr Allah (996–1021)
17. al-Zahir li-i'zaz Din Allah (1021–1036)
18. al-Mustansir Billah (1036–1094)
19. al-Musta'li Billah (1094–1101)
20. al-Amir bi-Ahkam Allah (1101–1130)
21. Abu'l-Qasim al-Tayyib (1130–1132)

Imams 11–21 were caliphs who ruled the Fatimid Caliphate.

The imams from Muhammad ibn Isma'il onward were occulted by the Musta'li; their names as listed by Dawoodi Bohra religious books are listed above.

=== Their ancestors and descendants according to Ismā'īlī-Mustā'lī Imāmah doctrine ===
Jāʿfar al-Sādiq (Imamāh‘Shi'ā)	Fatima bint al-Hussain'l-Athram bin al-Ḥasan bin Ali
Al-Aftāh (Aftāhīyyah)	Ismā‘il (Ismā‘il’īyyah)
Muhammad	Muhammed
Al-Wafi
At-Tāqī
Ar-Rāḍī
Mahdi Billāh
Fatimids (Ismailism)
Al-Qā'im
Al-Mansur
Al-Mu'izz
Al-Aziz
Al-Hakim
Al-Zahir
Al-Mustansir
Nizār al-Muṣṭafá (Nizārīyyah)	Muhammad	Al-Mustā‘lī (Mustā‘līyyah)
Al-Āmīr
Al-Sabbah (Hassasin)	Al-Hāfiz (Ḥāfīzīyyah)	Aṭ-Ṭāyyīb (Ṭāyyībīyyah)
Al-Zāfīr	Yūssuf
Nizārī Imāmah	Al-Fā'īz	Tayyibi Dā'ĩs
Al-'Āḍīd
Nizārī Ismāilism	Dawoodi Dā'ĩs

=== Da'is ===
Arwa al-Sulayhi was the Hujjah from the time of Imam Mustansir. She appointed Dai in Yemen to run religious affair. Ismaili missionaries Ahmed and Abdullah (in about 1067 AD (460 AH)) were sent to India in that time. According to Fatimid tradition, after the death of Al-Amir bi-Ahkami'l-Lah, Arwa al-Sulayhi instituted the Da'i al-Mutlaq in place of Dai to run the independent dawah from Yemen in the name of Imam Tayyib. The Dais are appointed one after other in the same philosophy of nass (nomination by predecessor) as done by earlier imams. It is believed that God's representative cannot die before appointing his true successor. This is being followed from the time of 3rd Imam Ali al-Sajjad, the strong army of Yazid also could not think of killing him, although they did not spare even a child of six months, Ali al-Asghar ibn Husayn.

Under the fifteenth Imam, Al-Aziz Billah, the fifth Fatimid caliph, religious tolerance was given great importance. As a small Shi'i group ruling over a majority Sunni population with a Christian minority also, the Fatimid caliphs were careful to respect the sentiments of people. One of the viziers of Imam Aziz was Christian, and high offices were held by both Shia and Sunnis. Fatimid advancement in state offices was based more on merit than on heredity.

Al-Aziz Billah rebuilt the Saint Mercurius Church in Coptic Cairo near Fustat and encouraged public theological debate between the chief Fatimid qadi and the bishops of Oriental Orthodoxy in the interest of ecumenism.

=== Profession of faith ===
As is the case with the majority of the Shia, Ismailis conclude the Shahada with ʿAliyun waliyu l-Lah ("Ali is the successor of God"). Musta'lis recite the following shahada:

ʾašhadu ʾan lā ʾilāha ʾillā l-Lāh,
waʾašhadu ʾan Muḥammadun ʿabduhun warasūlu l-Lāh;
ʾanna mawlāna ʿAliyun waṣiyuhu wawazīruhu;
I bear witness that there is no god but God,
and I bear witness that Mohammad is God's servant and His Messenger
and Ali is his successor and minister.

The first part of this shahada is common to all Muslims and is the fundamental declaration of tawhid. The wording of the last phrase is specific to the Musta'li.

The second phrase describes the principle of Prophecy in Shia Islam.

The third phrase describes the Musta'li theological position of the role of Ali.

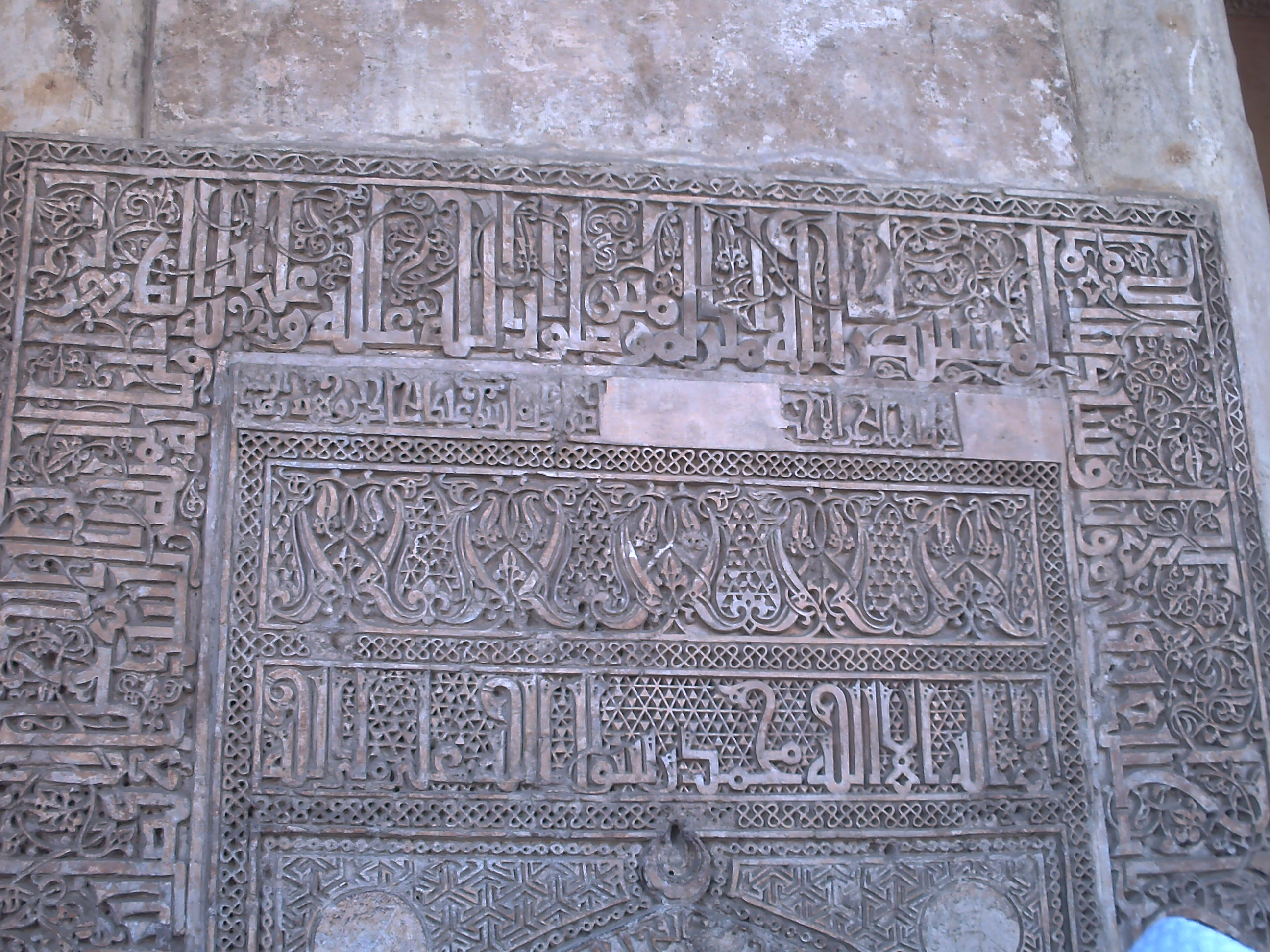
Photo of the qibla of al-Mustansir Billah in the Mosque of Ibn Tulun in Cairo showing the Shahada

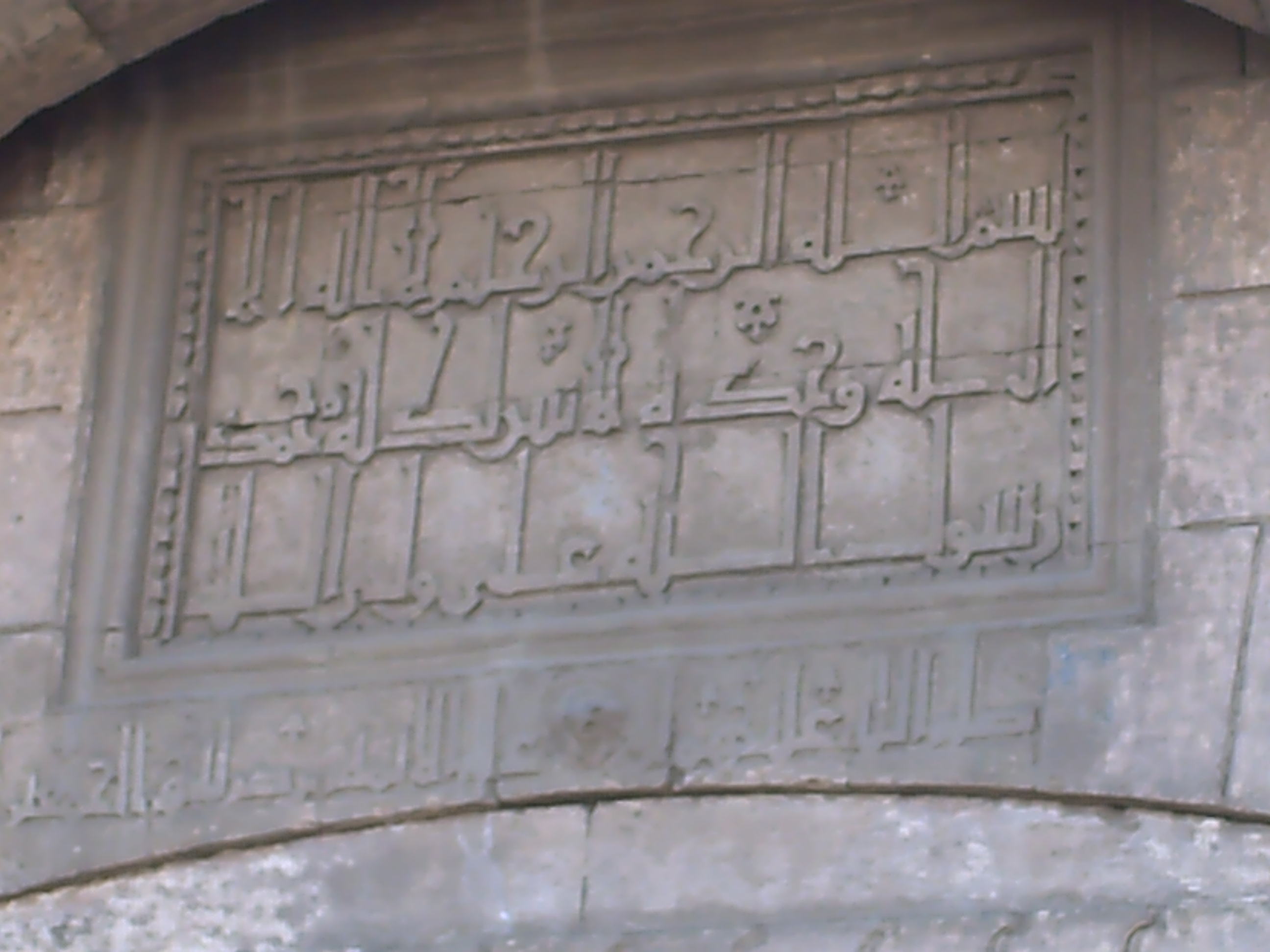
Photo of the Shahada at Bab al-Futuh Fatimid Cairo
