= Aleviler =

Idiom in Turkish

Aleviler is an term used synonymously in Turkish language to characterize premodern Alid dynasties of northern Iran; the Ismaʿilis of the Pamir Mountains in Turkestan; and for followers for Alevism, a non-Ja'fari school sect of Twelver Shi'isms in Turkey.

== Classification of Aleviler ==
- Pamiri Islam
  - Zaydism in Tabaristan, Daylam, and Gilan emerged under the influence of the Hasan ibn Zayd and the efforts of Hasan al-Utrush
  - Ismailism in the Pamir Mountains, emerged under the influence of Nasir Khusraw, an emissary sent by Fatimid caliph al-Mustansir Billah
- Safaviler or Kizilbashler, a ghulāt community in Turkey descended from the Safavid order
- Bektashism, a religious community in Turkey, Balkans, and Albania
- Ali-Illahism
- Ishikism, a new religious movement
