= Ismailism =

Branch of Shia Islam

- الإسماعيلية (Arabic); اسماعیلیان (Persian)
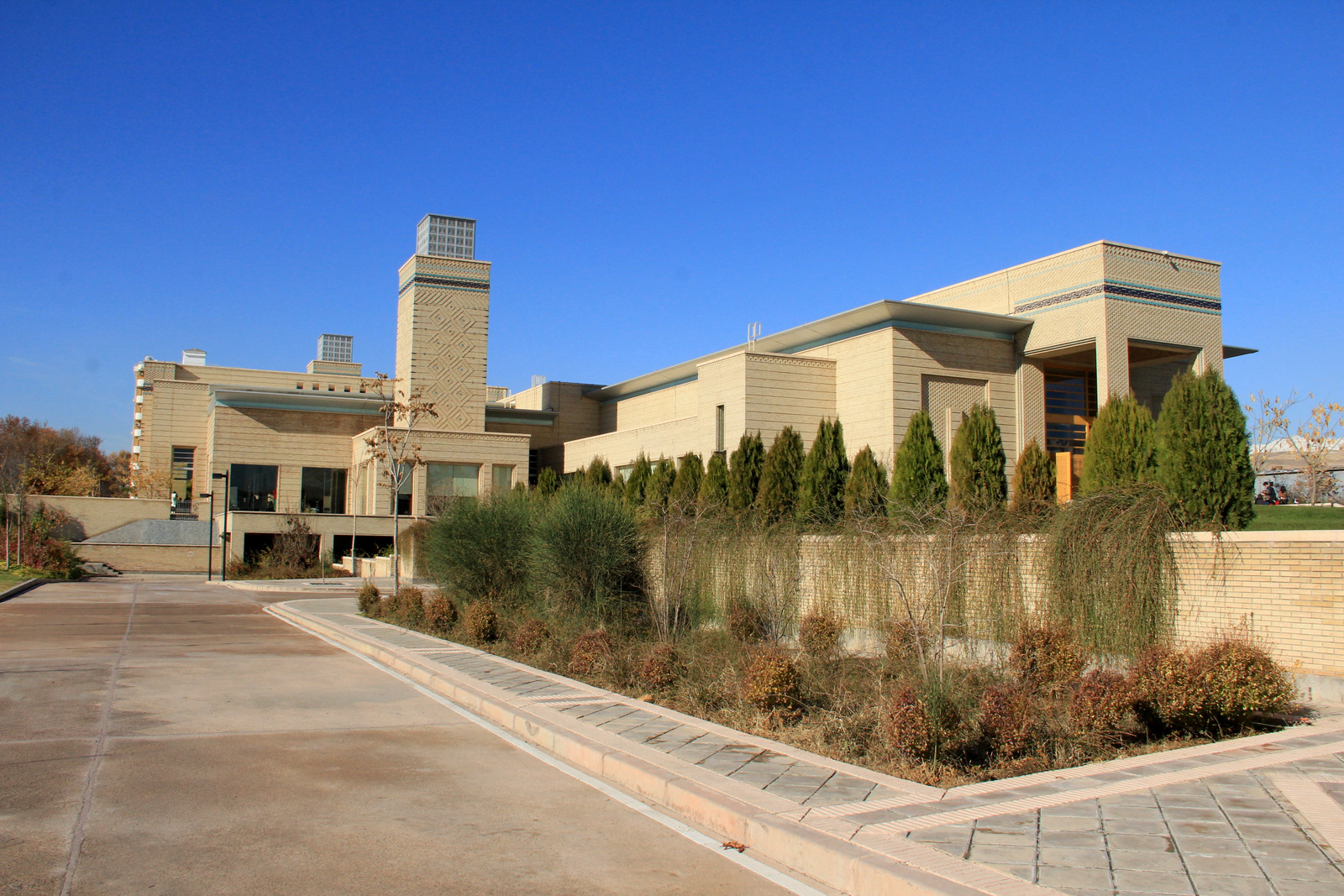
- Ismaili Center in Dushanbe, Tajikistan
- Classification: Shia Islam
- Scripture: Quran
- Theology: Imamate
- Imam (Nizari): Aga Khan V
- Branches and sects: Branches and sects of Isma'ilism
- Region: Ismāʿīli communities can be found in Pakistan, Tajikistan, China, Afghanistan, India, Central Asia, Syria, Iran, Saudi Arabia, Yemen, Eastern Africa, and North America
- Origin: 9th century Middle East
- Separations: Druze
- Members: 12–15 million

Ismailism, (Note: Arabic: الإسماعيلية, romanized: al-Ismāʿīliyya; Persian: اسماعیلیان, romanized: Esmāʿīliyān) known historically as Batiniyya (lit. 'esotericism'), (Note: Arabic: باطنية, romanized: Bāṭiniyyah) is a denomination of Shia Islam. It is one of the three denominations of Shia Islam, the other two being Twelver Shia Islam and Zaydism. The Ismailis and Zaydis constitute a minority within Shia Islam, in contrast to Twelvers, who constitute the predominant denomination. The Ismailis emphasize a distinction between the exoteric (zahir) and esoteric (batin) dimension of Islam. Unlike the Twelvers, the Ismailis are characterized by a unique emphasis on the esoteric. The Isma'ilis get their name from their acceptance of Isma'il ibn Ja'far as the appointed spiritual successor (Imām) to Ja'far al-Sadiq. The question of succession after al-Sadiq's death divided the early Shia Muslims. The first group accepted the Imamate of his younger son Musa al-Kazim, while the second group considered the Imam to be his eldest son Isma'il, who had predeceased his father. The first and much larger group became known as the Twelvers, while the second and much smaller group came to be known as the Isma'ilis, which separated from the mainstream Shia Islam and formed the Isma'ili sect.

Isma'ili thought is heavily influenced by Neoplatonism. After the death of Muhammad ibn Isma'il in the 8th century CE, the teachings of Ismailism further transformed into the belief system as it is known today, with an explicit concentration on the deeper, esoteric meaning (batin) of the Islamic religion. With the eventual development of Usulism and Akhbarism into the more literalistic (zahir) oriented, Shia Islam developed into two separate directions: the metaphorical Ismaili, Alevi, Bektashi, Alian, and Alawite groups focusing on the mystical path and nature of God, along with the "Imam of the Time" representing the manifestation of esoteric truth and intelligible divine reality, with the more literalistic Usuli and Akhbari groups focusing on divine law (sharia) and the deeds and sayings (sunnah) of Muhammad and the Twelve Imams who were guides and a light to God.

Today, the largest branch of Ismaili are the Nizaris, the majority of whom are Qasimi Nizari recognising Aga Khan V as the 50th hereditary Imam, while smaller communities of Mumini Nizari continue to exist in Syria. The remaining extant groups of Ismaili belong to the Tayyibi sect of the Musta'li branch. The community with the highest percentage of Ismailis is Gorno-Badakhshan, but Isma'ilis can be found in Central Asia, China, Afghanistan, Iran, Pakistan, Yemen, Lebanon, Malaysia, Syria, India, Saudi Arabia, Jordan, Iraq, Kuwait, East Africa, Angola, Bangladesh, and South Africa, and have in recent years emigrated to Europe, Russia, Canada, Australia, New Zealand, the United States, and Trinidad and Tobago.

== History ==
=== Succession crisis ===
Ismailism shares its beginnings with other early Shia sects that emerged during the succession crisis that spread throughout the early Muslim community. From the beginning, the Shia asserted the right of Ali, cousin of Muhammad, to have both political and spiritual control over the community. This also included his two sons, who were the grandsons of Muhammad through his daughter Fatima. The conflict remained relatively peaceful between the partisans of Ali and those who asserted a semi-democratic system of electing caliphs, until the third Rashidun caliph (Uthman) was killed and Ali ascended to the caliphate with popular support.

Soon after his ascendancy, Aisha, the third of Muhammad's wives, claimed, along with Uthman's tribe, the Umayyads, that Ali should take qisas (blood for blood) from the people responsible for Uthman's death. Ali voted against it, as he believed that the situation at the time demanded a peaceful resolution of the matter. Though both parties could rightfully defend their claims, due to escalated misunderstandings, the Battle of the Camel was fought and Aisha was defeated, but was respectfully escorted to Medina by Ali.

Following this battle, Mu'awiya I, the Umayyad governor of Syria, also staged a revolt under the same pretences. Ali led his forces against Mu'awiya until the side of Mu'awiya held copies of the Quran against their spears and demanded that the issue be decided by Islam's holy book. Ali accepted this, and an arbitration was done, which ended in his favor. A group among Ali's army believed that subjecting his legitimate authority to arbitration was tantamount to apostasy, and abandoned his forces. This group, known as the Khawarij, was defeated by Ali before they reached the cities, where they would have been able to blend in with the rest of the population. While he was unable to do this, he nonetheless defeated their forces in subsequent battles.

Regardless of these defeats, the Kharijites survived and became a violently problematic group in Islamic history. After plotting assassinations against Ali, Mu'awiya, and the arbitrator of their conflict, a Kharijite successfully assassinated Ali in 661 CE. The Imāmate then passed to his son Hasan ibn Ali, and later to his son Husayn ibn Ali. According to the Nizari Isma'ili tradition, Hasan was "an Entrusted Imam" (Arabic: الإمام المستودع, romanized: al-imām al-mustawdaʿ), Husayn was the "Permanent Imam" (Arabic: الإمام المستقر, romanized: al-imām al-mustaqar). The Entrusted Imam is an Imam in the full sense except that the lineage of the Imamate must continue through the Permanent Imam. However, the political Caliphate was soon taken over by Mu'awiya, the only leader in the empire at that time with an army large enough to seize control.

Even some of Ali's early followers regarded him as "an absolute and divinely guided leader", whose demands of his followers were "the same kind of loyalty that would have been expected for the Prophet". For example, one of Ali's supporters who also was devoted to Muhammad said to him: "our opinion is your opinion and we are in the palm of your right hand." The early followers of Ali seem to have taken his guidance as "right guidance" deriving from Divine support. In other words, Ali's guidance was seen to be the expression of God's will and the Quranic message. This spiritual and absolute authority of Ali was known as walayah, and it was inherited by his successors, the Imams.

In the 1st century after Muhammad, the term 'sunnah' was not specifically defined as "Sunnah of the Prophet", but was used in connection to Abu Bakr, Umar, Uthman, and some Umayyad Caliphs. The idea of hadith, or traditions ascribed to Muhammad, was not mainstream, nor was hadith criticised. Even the earliest legal texts by Malik b. Anas and Abu Hanifa employ many methods, including analogical reasoning and opinion, and do not rely exclusively on hadith. Only in the 2nd century does the Sunni jurist al-Shafi'i first argue that only the sunnah of Muhammad should be a source of law, and that this sunnah is embodied in hadiths. It would take another one hundred years after al-Shafi'i for Sunni Muslim jurists to fully base their methodologies on prophetic hadiths. Meanwhile, Imami Shia Muslims followed the Imams' interpretations of Islam as normative without any need for hadiths and other sources of Sunni law such as analogy and opinion.

=== Karbala and afterward ===
==== The Battle of Karbala ====
After the death of Imam Hasan, Imam Husayn and his family were increasingly worried about the religious and political persecution that was becoming commonplace under the reign of Mu'awiya's son, Yazid. Amidst this turmoil in 680, Husayn, along with the women and children of his family, upon receiving invitational letters and gestures of support by Kufis, wished to go to Kufa and confront Yazid as an intercessor on behalf of the citizens of the empire. However, he was stopped by Yazid's army in Karbala during the month of Muharram. His family was starved and deprived of water and supplies, until eventually the army came in on the tenth day and martyred Husayn and his companions, and enslaved the rest of the women and family, taking them to Kufa.

This battle would become extremely important to the Shia psyche. The Twelvers as well as Musta'li Isma'ili still mourn this event during an occasion known as Ashura.

The Nizari Isma'ili, however, do not mourn this in the same way because of the belief that the light of the Imam never dies but rather passes on to the succeeding Imām, making mourning arbitrary. However, during commemoration, there are no celebrations in Jama'at Khana during Muharram, and there may be announcements or sessions regarding the tragic events of Karbala. Also, individuals may observe Muharram in a wide variety of ways. This respect for Muharram does not include self-flagellation and beating because they feel that harming one's body is harming a gift from God.

Ambigram depicting Muhammad and Ali written in a single word. The 180 degrees inverted form shows both words.

==== The beginnings of Ismāʿīlī Daʿwah ====
After being set free by Yazid, Zaynab bint Ali, the daughter of Fatimah and Ali and the sister of Hasan and Husayn, started to spread the word of Karbala to the Muslim world, making speeches regarding the event. This was the first organized daʿwah of the Shia, which would later develop into an extremely spiritual institution for the Ismāʿīlīs.

After the poisoning of Ali ibn Husayn Zayn al-Abidin by Hisham ibn Abd al-Malik in 713, the first succession crisis of the Shia arose with Zayd ibn ʻAlī's companions and the Zaydīs who claimed Zayd ibn ʻAlī as the Imām, whilst the rest of the Shia upheld Muhammad al-Baqir as the Imām. The Zaidis argued that any sayyid or "descendant of Muhammad through Hasan or Husayn" who rebelled against tyranny and the injustice of his age could be the Imām. The Zaidis created the Zaydism.

In contrast to his predecessors, Muhammad al-Baqir focused on academic Islamic scholarship in Medina, where he promulgated his teachings to many Muslims, both Shia and non-Shia, in an extremely organized form of Daʿwah. In fact, the earliest text of the Ismaili school of thought is said to be the Umm al-kitab (The Archetypal Book), a conversation between Muhammad al-Baqir and three of his disciples.

This tradition would pass on to his son, Ja'far al-Sadiq, who inherited the Imāmate on his father's death in 743. Ja'far al-Sadiq excelled in the scholarship of the day and had many pupils, including three of the four founders of the Sunni madhhabs.

However, following al-Sadiq's poisoning in 765, a fundamental split occurred in the community. Ismaʻil ibn Jafar, who at one point was appointed by his father as the next Imam, appeared to have predeceased his father in 755. While Twelvers argue that either he was never heir apparent or he truly predeceased his father and hence Musa al-Kadhim was the true heir to the Imamate, the Ismāʿīlīs argue that either the death of Ismaʻil was staged in order to protect him from Abbasid persecution or that the Imamate passed to Muhammad ibn Ismaʻil in lineal descent.

=== Ascension of the Dais ===
For some partisans of Isma'il, the Imamate ended with Isma'il ibn Ja'far. Most Ismailis recognized Muhammad ibn Ismaʻil as the next Imam, and some saw him as the expected Mahdi that Ja'far al-Sadiq had preached about. However, at this point, the Isma'ili Imams, according to the Nizari and Mustaali, found areas where they would be able to be safe from the recently founded Abbasid Caliphate, which had defeated and seized control from the Umayyads in 750 CE.

At this point, some of the Isma'ili community believed that Muhammad ibn Isma'il had gone into the Occultation and that he would one day return. A small group traced the Imamate among Muhammad ibn Isma'il's lineal descendants. With the status and location of the Imams not known to the community, the concealed Isma'ili Imams began to propagate the faith through Da'iyyun from its base in Syria. This was the start of the spiritual beginnings of the Daʿwah that would later play important parts in the all Ismaili branches, especially the Nizaris and the Musta'lis.

The Da'i was not a missionary in the typical sense, and he was responsible for both the conversion of his student and the mental and spiritual well-being. The Da'i was a guide and light to the Imam. The teacher-student relationship of the Da'i and his student was much like the one that would develop in Sufism. The student desired God, and the Da'i could bring him to God by making him recognize the Imam, who possesses the knowledge of the Oneness of God. The Da'i and Imam were respectively the spiritual mother and spiritual father of the Isma'ili believers.

Ja'far bin Mansur al-Yaman's The Book of the Sage and Disciple is a classic of early Fatimid literature, documenting important aspects of the development of the Isma'ili da'wa in tenth-century Yemen. The book is also of considerable historical value for modern scholars of Arabic prose literature as well as those interested in the relationship of esoteric Shia with early Islamic mysticism. Likewise, the book is an important source of information on the various movements within tenth-century Shīa, leading to the spread of the Fatimid-Isma'ili da'wa throughout the medieval Islamicate world, as well as on the religious and philosophical history of the post-Fatimid Musta'li branch of Isma'ilism in Yemen and India.

=== The Qarmatians ===
While many of the Isma'ili were content with the Da'i teachings, a group that mingled Persian nationalism and Zoroastrianism surfaced, known as the Qarmatians. With their headquarters in Bahrain, they accepted a young Persian former prisoner by the name of Abu'l-Fadl al-Isfahani, who claimed to be the descendant of the Persian kings as their Mahdi, and rampaged across the Middle East in the tenth century, climaxing their violent campaign by stealing the Black Stone from the Kaaba in Mecca in 930 under Abu Tahir al-Jannabi. Following the arrival of the Al-Isfahani, they changed their qibla from the Kaaba in Mecca to the Zoroastrian-influenced fire. After their return of the Black Stone in 951 and a defeat by the Abbasids in 976, the group slowly dwindled off and no longer has any adherents.

=== The Fatimid Caliphate ===
==== Rise of the Fatimid Caliphate ====
The political asceticism practiced by the Imāms during the period after Muhammad ibn Ismail was to be short-lived and finally concluded with the Imāmate of Abdullah al-Mahdi Billah, who was born in 873. After decades of Ismāʿīlīs believing that Muhammad ibn Ismail was in the Occultation and would return to bring an age of justice, al-Mahdi taught that the Imāms had not been literally secluded, but rather had remained hidden to protect themselves and had been organizing the Da'i, and even acted as Da'i themselves.

After raising an army and successfully defeating the Aghlabids in North Africa and a number of other victories, al-Mahdi Billah successfully established a Shia political state ruled by the Imāmate in 910. This was the only time in history where the Shia Imamate and Caliphate were united after the first Imam, Ali ibn Abi Talib.

In parallel with the dynasty's claim of descent from ʻAlī and Fāṭimah, the empire was named "Fatimid". However, this was not without controversy, and recognizing the extent that Ismāʿīlī doctrine had spread, the Abbasid Caliphate assigned Sunni and Twelver scholars the task to disprove the lineage of the new dynasty. This became known as the Baghdad Manifesto, which tries to trace the lineage of the Fatimids to an alleged Jewish blacksmith.

==== The Middle East under Fatimid rule ====
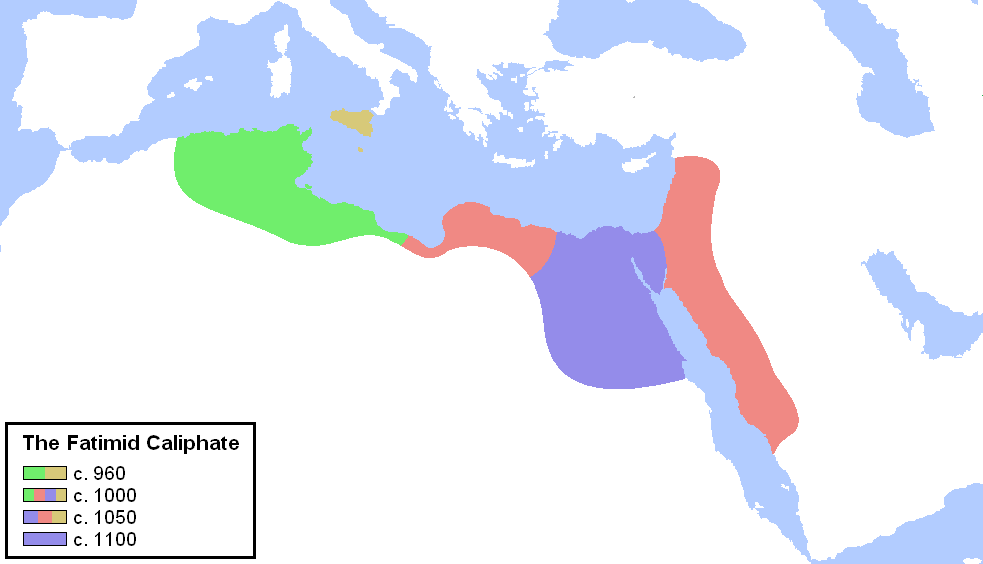
The Fatimid Caliphate at its peak

The Fatimid Caliphate expanded quickly under the subsequent Imams. Under the Fatimids, Egypt became the center of an empire that included at its peak North Africa, Sicily, Palestine, Syria, the Red Sea coast of Africa, Yemen, Hejaz and the Tihamah. Under the Fatimids, Egypt flourished and developed an extensive trade network in both the Mediterranean Sea and the Indian Ocean, which eventually determined the economic course of Egypt during the High Middle Ages.

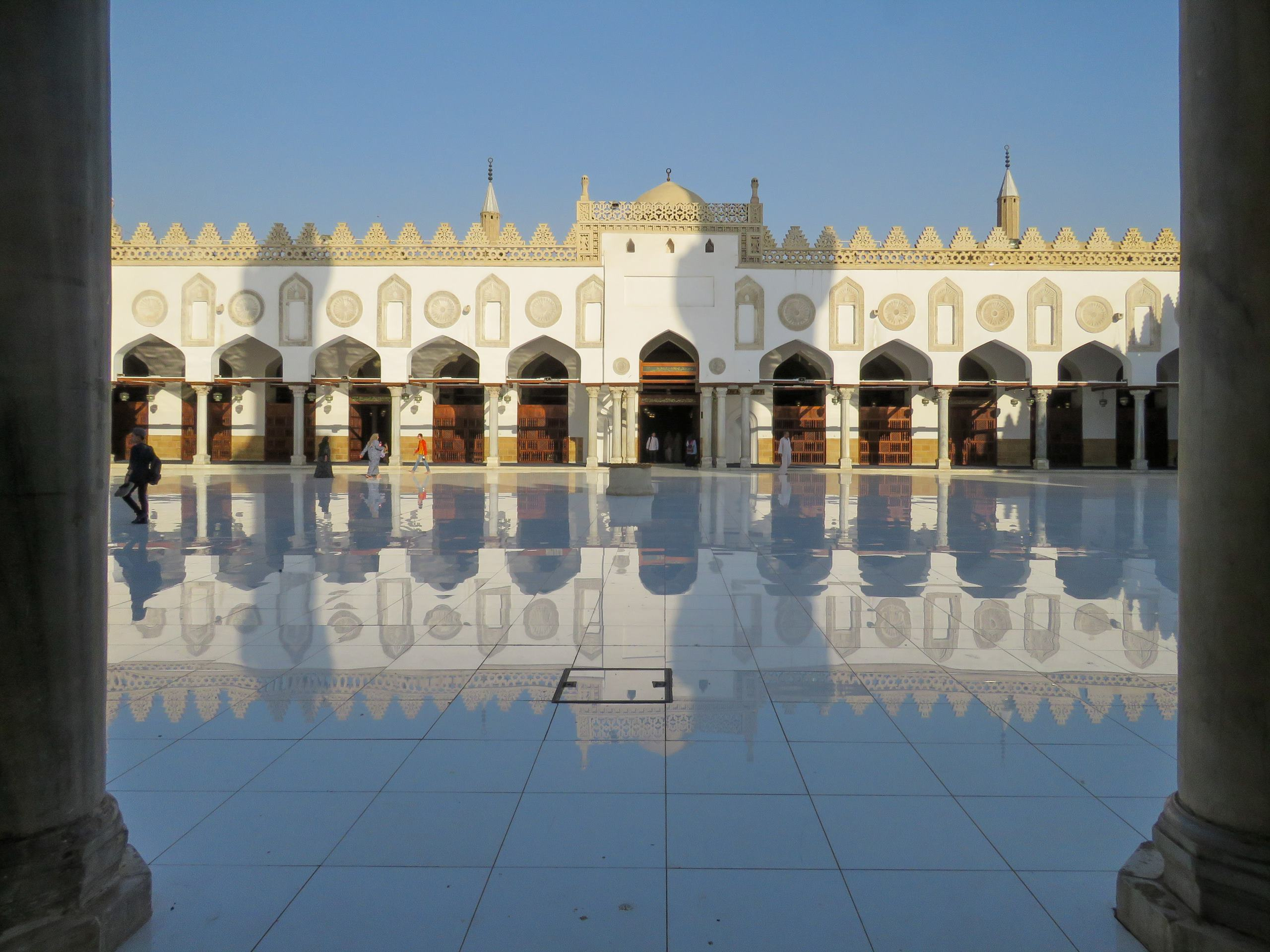
Al-Azhar Mosque in Cairo was originally built as the official mosque of a new Fatimid capital between 970 and 972 and became an educational institution that disseminated Isma'ili doctrine.

The Fatimids promoted ideas that were radical for the time. One was a promotion by merit rather than genealogy. Also during this period, the three contemporary branches of Isma'ilism formed. The first branch (Druze) occurred with the al-Hakim bi-Amr Allah. Born in 985, he ascended as ruler at the age of eleven. A religious group that began forming in his lifetime broke off from mainstream Ismailism and refused to acknowledge his successor. Later to be known as the Druze, they believe Al-Hakim to be the manifestation of God and the prophesied Mahdi, who would one day return and bring justice to the world. The faith further split from Ismailism as it developed unique doctrines which often class it separately from both Ismailism and Islam.

Arwa al-Sulayhi was the Hujjah in Yemen from the time of Imam al-Mustansir. She appointed Da'i in Yemen to run religious affairs. Ismaili missionaries Ahmed and Abadullah (in about 1067 CE (460 AH)) were also sent to India in that time. They sent Syedi Nuruddin to Dongaon to look after the southern part and Syedi Fakhruddin to East Rajasthan, India.

The second split occurred following the death of al-Mustansir Billah in 1094 CE. His rule was the longest of any caliph in both the Fatimid and other Islamic empires. After he died, his sons Nizar, the older, and al-Musta'li, the younger, fought for political and spiritual control of the dynasty. Nizar was defeated and jailed, but according to Nizari sources, his son escaped to Alamut, where the Iranian Isma'ilis had accepted his claim.

The Musta'li line split again between the Taiyabi and the Hafizi, the former claiming that the 21st Imam and son of al-Amir bi-Ahkami'l-Lah went into occultation and appointed a Da'i al-Mutlaq to guide the community, in a similar manner as the Isma'ili had lived after the death of Muhammad ibn Isma'il. The latter claimed that the ruling Fatimid caliph was the Imām. However, in the Mustaali branch, Dai came to have a similar but more important task. The term Da'i al-Mutlaq (Arabic: الداعي المطلق, romanized: al-dāʿī al-muṭlaq) literally means "the absolute or unrestricted missionary". This da'i was the only source of the Imam's knowledge after the occultation of al-Qasim in Musta'li thought.

According to Taiyabi Ismaili tradition, after the death of Imam al-Amir, his infant son, at-Tayyib Abu'l-Qasim, about 2 years old, was protected by the most important woman in Musta'li history after Muhammad's daughter, Fatimah. She was Arwa al-Sulayhi, a queen in Yemen. She was promoted to the post of hujjah long before by Imām Mustansir at the death of her husband. She ran the da'wat from Yemen in the name of Imaam Tayyib. She was instructed and prepared by Imam Mustansir and ran the dawat from Yemen in the name of Imaam Tayyib, following Imams for the second period of Satr. It was going to be on her hands that Imam Tayyib would go into seclusion, and she would institute the office of the Da'i al-Mutlaq. Zoeb bin Moosa was first to be instituted to this office. The office of the da'i continued in Yemen up to the 24th da'i Yusuf, who shifted da'wat to India. Before the shift of da'wat in India, the da'i's representatives were known as Wali-ul-Hind. Syedi Hasan Feer was one of the prominent Isma'ili wali of the 14th century. The line of Tayyib Da'is that began in 1132 is continuing under the main sect known as Dawoodi Bohra (see list of Dai of Dawoodi Bohra).

The Musta'li split several times over disputes regarding who was the rightful Da'i al-Mutlaq, the leader of the community within the Occultation. After the 27th Da'i, Syedna Dawood bin Qutub Shah, there was another split; the ones following Syedna Dawood came to be called Dawoodi Bohra, and followers of Suleman were then called Sulaimani. Dawoodi Bohra's present Da'i al Mutlaq, the 53rd, is Syedna Mufaddal Saifuddin, and he and his devout followers tread the same path, following the same tradition of the Aimmat Fatimiyyeen. The Sulaymani are mostly concentrated in Yemen and Saudi Arabia, with some communities in South Asia. The Dawoodi Bohra and Alavi Bohra are mostly exclusive to South Asia, after the migration of the da'wah from Yemen to India. Other groups include Atba-i-Malak and Hebtiahs Bohra. Mustaali beliefs and practices, unlike those of the Nizari and Druze, are regarded as compatible with mainstream Islam, representing a continuation of Fatimid tradition and fiqh.

==== Decline of the Caliphate ====
In the 1040s, the Zirid dynasty (governors of the Maghreb under the Fatimids) declared their independence and their conversion to Sunni Islam, which led to the devastating Banu Hilal invasions. After about 1070, the Fatimid hold on the Levant coast, and parts of Syria, was challenged first by Turkish invasions, then by the First Crusade, so that Fatimid territory shrank until it consisted only of Egypt. Damascus fell to the Seljuk Empire in 1076, leaving the Fatimids only in charge of Egypt and the Levantine coast up to Tyre and Sidon. Because of the vehement opposition to the Fatimids from the Seljuks, the Ismaili movement was only able to operate as a terrorist underground movement, much like the Assassins.

After the decay of the Fatimid political system in the 1160s, the Zengid ruler Nur ad-Din, atabeg of Aleppo had his general, Saladin, seize Egypt in 1169, forming the Sunni Ayyubid dynasty. This signaled the end of the Hafizi Mustaali branch of Ismailism as well as the Fatimid Caliphate.

=== Alamut ===
==== Hassan-i Sabbah ====
Very early in the empire's life, the Fatimids sought to spread the Isma'ili faith, which in turn would spread loyalty to the Imamate in Egypt. One of their earliest attempts was taken by a missionary by the name of Hassan-i Sabbah. Hassan-i Sabbah was born into a Twelver family living in the scholarly Persian city of Qom in 1056 CE. His family later relocated to Tehran, an area with an extremely active Isma'ili Da'wah. He immersed himself in Ismāʿīlī thought; however, he did not choose to convert until he was overcome with an almost fatal illness and feared dying without knowing the Imām of his time. Afterward, Hassan-i Sabbah became one of the most influential Da'is in Isma'ili history; he became important to the survival of the Nizari branch of Ismailism, which today is its largest branch.

Legend holds that Hassan-i Sabbah met with Imam al-Mustansir Billah and asked him who his successor would be, to which he responded that it would be his eldest son Nizar (Fatimid Imam). Hassan-i Sabbah continued his missionary activities, which climaxed with his taking of the famous citadel of Alamut. Over the next two years, he converted most of the surrounding villages to Isma'ilism. Afterward, he converted most of the staff to Ismailism, took over the fortress, and presented Alamut's king with payment for his fortress, which he had no choice but to accept. The king reluctantly abdicated his throne, and Hassan-i Sabbah turned Alamut into an outpost of Fatimid rule within Abbasid territory.

==== The Hashasheen / Assassiyoon ====
Surrounded by the Abbasids and other hostile powers and low in numbers, Hassan-i Sabbah devised a way to attack the Isma'ili enemies with minimal losses. Using the method of assassination, he ordered the murders of Sunni scholars and politicians who he felt threatened the Isma'ilis. Knives and daggers were used to kill, and sometimes as a warning; a knife would be placed on the pillow of a Sunni, who understood the message to mean that he was marked for death. When an assassination was actually carried out, the Hashasheen would not be allowed to run away; instead, to strike further fear into the enemy, they would stand near the victim without showing any emotion and departed only when the body was discovered. This further increased the ruthless reputation of the Hashasheen throughout Sunni-controlled lands.

The English word assassins is said to have been derived from the Arabic word Hasaseen meaning annihilators, as mentioned in Quran 3:152 or Hashasheen meaning both "those who use hashish" and "throat slitters" in Egyptian Arabic dialect, and one of the Shia Ismaili sects in the Syria of the eleventh century.

==== Threshold of the Imāmate ====
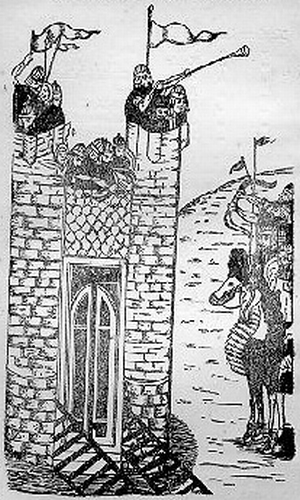
View of Alamut besieged

After Nizar was imprisoned by his younger brother, Ahmad al-Musta'li, various sources indicate that Nizar's son, Ali al-Hadi ibn Nizari, survived and fled to Alamut. He was offered a safe place in Alamut, where Hassan-Al-Sabbah welcomed him. However, it is believed this was not announced to the public and the lineage was hidden until a few Imāms later to avoid further attacks and hostility.

It was announced with the advent of Imam Hassan II. In a show of his Imamate and to emphasize the interior meaning (the batin) over the exterior meaning (the zahir), only two years after his accession, the Imām Hasan 'Ala Zikrihi al-Salam conducted a ceremony known as qiyama (resurrection) at the grounds of the Alamut Castle, whereby the Imam would once again become visible to his community of followers in and outside of the Nizārī Ismā'īlī state. Given Juwayni's polemical aims and the fact that he burned the Isma'ili libraries, which may have offered much more reliable testimony about the history, scholars have been dubious of his narrative but are forced to rely on it given the absence of alternative sources.

Descriptions of the event are also preserved in Rashid al-Din's narrative and recounted in the Haft Bab Baba-yi Sayyidna, written 60 years after the event, and the later Haft Bab-i Abi Ishaq, an Ismaili book of the 15th century CE. However, Rashid al-Din's narrative is based on Juwayni, and the Nizari sources do not go into specific details. Since very few contemporary Nizari Ismaili accounts of the events have survived, it is likely that scholars will never know the exact details of this event. However, there was no total abrogation of all law; only certain exoteric rituals, such as Salah/Namaz, Fasting in Ramadan, Hajj to Makkah, and facing Makkah in prayer, were abrogated; the Nizaris continued to perform rituals of worship, though these were more esoteric and spiritually oriented. For example, the true prayer is to remember God at every moment; true fasting is to keep all of the body's organs away from whatever is unethical and forbidden. Ethical conduct is enjoined at all times.

Afterward, his descendants ruled as the Imams at Alamut until its destruction by the Mongols.

==== Destruction by the Mongols ====
Through the 12th century, the Isma'ili continued to successfully ward off Sunni attempts to take Alamut, including by Saladin. The stronghold eventually met its destruction at the hands of the Khans in 1256. Hulagu Khan, a grandson of Genghis Khan led the devastating attack personally. As he would later do to the House of Wisdom in Baghdad, Hulagu destroyed Isma'ili as well as Islamic sacred and religious texts. The Imamate in Alamut, along with its few followers, was forced to flee and take refuge elsewhere.

=== Aftermath ===
After the fall of the Fatimid Caliphate and its bases in Iran and Syria, the three currently living branches of Isma'ili generally developed geographically isolated from each other, with the exception of Syria (which has both Druze and Nizari) and Pakistan and the rest of South Asia (which had both Mustaali and Nizari). The Musta'li progressed mainly under the Isma'ili-adhering Yemeni ruling class well into the 12th century, until the fall of the last Sulayhid dynasty, Hamdanids (Yemen) and Zurayids rump state in 1197 CE, then they shifted their da'wat to India under the Da'i al-Mutlaq, working on behalf of their last Imam, Taiyyab, and are known as Bohra. From India, various groups spread mainly to South Asia and eventually to the Middle East, Europe, Africa, and America.

The Nizari have maintained large populations in Syria, Uzbekistan, Tajikistan, Afghanistan, Pakistan, India, and they have smaller populations in China, East Africa and Iran. This community is the only one with a living Imam, who holds the title Aga Khan. Badakhshan, which includes parts of northeastern Afghanistan and southeastern Tajikistan, is the only part of the world where Ismailis make up the majority of the population. This is due to Isma'ili scholar Nasir Khusraw, who spent the last decades of his life as a hermit in Badakhshan, gathering a considerable number of devoted adherents, who have handed down his doctrines to succeeding generations.

The Druze mainly settled in Syria and Lebanon and developed a community based upon the principles of reincarnation through their own descendants. Their leadership is based on community scholars, who are the only individuals allowed to read their holy texts. There is controversy over whether this group falls under the classification of Isma'ilism or Islam because of its unique beliefs.

The Tajiks of Xinjiang, being Isma'ili, were not subjected to being enslaved in China by Sunni Muslim Turkic peoples because the two peoples did not share a common geographical region. The Burusho people of Pakistan are also Nizaris. However, due to their isolation from the rest of the world, Islam reached the Hunza about 350 years ago. Ismailism has been practiced by the Hunza for the last 300 years. The Hunza have been ruled by the same family of kings for over 900 years. They were called Kanjuts. Sunni Islam never took root in this part of central Asia, so even now, there are fewer than a few dozen Sunnis living among the Hunza.

=== Ismaili historiography ===
One of the most important texts in Ismaili historiography is the ʿUyun al-Akhbar, which is a reference source on the history of Ismailism that was composed in 7 books by the Tayyibi Mustaʻlian Ismaili daʻi-scholar, Idris Imad al-Din (born ca. 1392). This text presents the most comprehensive history of the Ismaili Imams and daʻwa, from the earliest period of Muslim history until the late Fatimid era. The author, Idris Imad al-Din, descended from the prominent al-Walid family of the Quraysh in Yemen, who led the Tayyibi Mustaʻlian Ismaili daʻwa for more than three centuries. This gave him access to the literary heritage of the Ismailis, including the majority of the extant Fatimid manuscripts transferred to Yemen. The ʻUyun al-Akhbar is being published in 7 volumes of annotated Arabic critical editions as part of an institutional collaboration between the Institut Français du Proche Orient (IFPO) in Damascus and The Institute of Ismaili Studies (IIS) in London. This voluminous text has been critically edited based on several old manuscripts from The Institute of Ismaili Studies' vast collection. These academic editions have been prepared by a team of Syrian and Egyptian scholars, including Ayman F. Sayyid, and this major publication project has been coordinated by Nader El-Bizri (IIS) and Sarab Atassi-Khattab (IFPO).

== Beliefs ==
[Do] not abhor any science or shun any book, and [do] not be unduly biased against any creed; for our philosophy and creed encompasses all creeds and all knowledge; [for] our creed consists of studying all existing things in their entirety, the physical and the intellectual, from their beginning to their end, their apparent and their hidden, their manifest and their concealed, with the aim to grasp their Truth, with the understanding that they emanate from one source, one cause, one world, [and] one soul, which encompasses their different essences, their diverse species, their various types, and their changing forms.

— Excerpt from the Epistles of Ikhwan al-Safa, an encyclopedic work on religion, sciences, and philosophy that permeates the Isma'ili school of thought.

=== View on the Quran ===
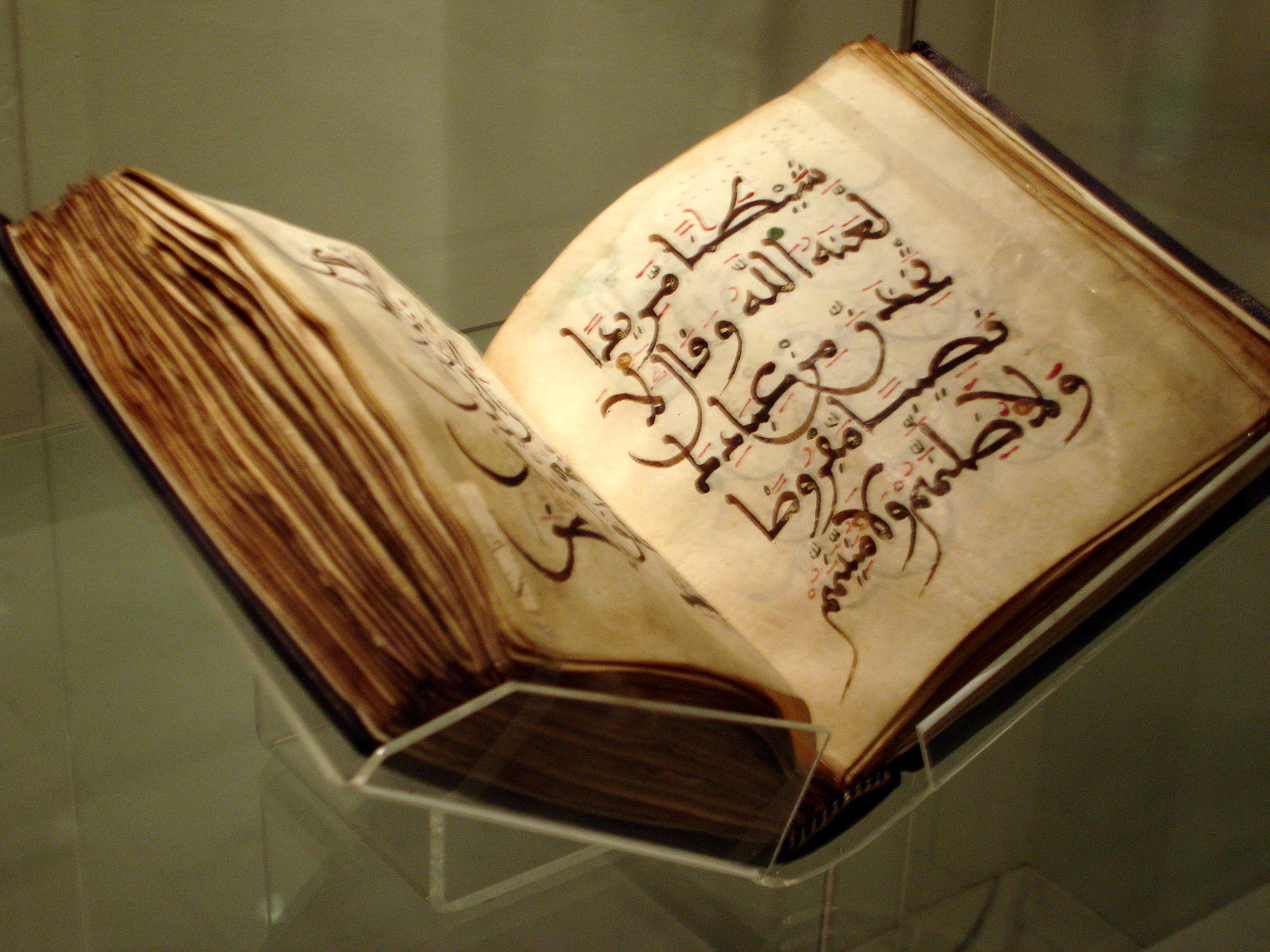
Ismāʿīlīs believe the Quran has two layers of meaning, the zāhir, meaning apparent, and the bātin, meaning hidden.

In the Isma'ili belief, God's Speech (kalam Allah) is the everlasting creative command that perpetuates all things and simultaneously embodies the essences of every existent being. This eternal commandment "flows" or "emanates" to prophets through a spiritual hierarchy that consists of the Universal Intellect, Universal Soul, and the angelic intermediaries of Jadd, Fath, and Khayal who are identified with the archangels Seraphiel, Michael, and Gabriel (Jibra'il in Arabic), respectively. As a result, the prophets receive revelations as divine, spiritual, and nonverbal "inspiration" (wahy) and "support" (taʾyīd), through the means of the Holy Spirit, Gabriel, which is a heavenly power that illuminates the souls of the prophets, just as the radiance of light reflects in a mirror. Accordingly, God illuminated Muhammad with a divine light (nur) that constituted the divine nonverbal revelation (through the medium of archangel Gabriel), and Muhammad, then, expressed the divine truths contained within this transmission in the Arabic terms that constitute the Quran. Consequently, the Isma'ilis believe that the Arabic Quran is God's Speech in a secondary and subordinate sense, as it only verbally expresses the "signs" (āyāt) of God's actual cosmic commandments.

According to the 14th Isma'ili Imam and fourth Fatimid Caliph Al-Mu'izz li-Din Allah, "[The Prophet] only conveyed the meanings of the inspiration [wahy] and the light – its obligations, rulings and allusions – by means of utterances composed with arranged, combined, intelligible, and audible letters".

The Isma'ili view on God's Speech is therefore in contrast with the Hanbali view that it is eternal sounds and letters, the Mu'tazila view that it is a temporally created provision of sounds, and also the Ash'ari and Maturidi views that it is an everlasting nonverbal attribute contained in God's essence. Even so, the Isma'ilis agree with most other Islamic schools of thought that the Quran is a miracle that is beyond imitation and without equal (mu'jiz), for its external linguistic form and presentiment of spiritual meanings transcends the limits of eminence of Arabic poetry, prose, and rhyming speech.

The Isma'ilis believe that Muhammad is the living embodiment of the Quran. For instance, the Isma'ili Da'i and poet Nasir-i Khusraw (Nasir Khusraw) believed that Muhammad's soul expressed God's nonverbal divine inspiration in the form of two symbolic oral discourses – the Quran and Prophetic guidance (Hadith). Therefore, on one hand, Muhammad constructed the verbal form of the Quran, and, on the other hand, through his existence, he embodied the living and speaking Quran: "The cause of all existents [ʿillat al-aysiyyāt] is only the Word of God, ... [T]he Speaker Prophet is found to be a receptacle [mahāll] for the Word of God in the corporeal world and is designated by its names". As such, Muhammad is the "locus of manifestation" (mazhar) of God's words, just as a reflective mirror to the radiance of light, and the Quran and Prophetic guidance (Hadith) are verbal manifestations of God's words, which are reflections from this mirror.

The Isma'ili view of revelation also influences their perception of the meaning of the Quran. In this view, the Quran and prophetic guidance (Hadith) are encoded in symbols in parables that preserve a superior level of meaning. As such, the literal interpretation of the Quran is only the "outward dimension" (zāhir) of the divine revelations that Muhammad received, and beyond it lies the "esoteric dimension" (batin) of the religion that contains the divine truths (haqāʾiq). The Ismailis maintain that divine guidance is required to access the divine truths and superior meanings contained within the revelations.

The method of spiritual hermeneutics that is used to reveal this "esoteric dimension" or batin of the divine revelation is known as taʾwīl. According to Nasir Khusraw, taʾwīl is the process of "returning" something to its metaphysical source. In the context of ontology, taʾwīl is to discern an object in its original ontological domain as a symbol and parable that represents a reality in a higher ontological domain The opposite of taʾwīl is tanzīl, which is to encode divine realities in the form of symbols and parables that are interpretable to human beings in the material world.

The Isma'ilis believe that besides prophets, God's Speech also illuminates the souls of the Legatees and Imams, through the medium of the Holy Spirit, which allows them to perform many of the spiritual functions of Muhammad. For example, in the Isma'ili hierarchical ranks (da'wa), Muhammad is the Messenger, Imam ʿAlī b. Abī Ṭālib (Ali) is his Legatee, and his successors from Imam Husayn ibn Ali to the Fatimid Caliphs (Fatimid Caliphate) are the Imams. As a result of being divinely inspired (muʾayyad), the Prophets, Legatees, and Imams can perform taʾwīl and disclose it as instruction (taʿlīm) to the lower ranks of the Ismaili da'wa, including regular people.

Unlike prophets, the Imams cannot compose a new tanzīl, instead they interpret the tanzīl (Quran) and prophetic guidance (Hadith) by reanalyzing them in the context of new circumstances, while retaining the underlying principled spirit, and help guide "spiritual adepts" to the divine truths by disclosing their inner meanings through the spiritual hermeneutics of taʾwīl. Every Imam provides this authoritative instruction (taʿlīm) to the community during their own time. As a consequence, the Isma'ili Imam acts as the "speaking Quran", while the Arabic Quran, in its written or recitative form, is consigned the position of the "silent Quran".

=== The Ginans and Qasidas ===
The Ginans are Nizari religious texts. They are written in the form of poetry by Pirs to interpret the meanings of Quranic ayat. In comparison to Ginans, Ismāʿīlīs of other origins, such as Persians, Arabs, and Central Asians, have qasidas (Arabic: قصيدة) written in Persian by missionaries such as Nasir Khusraw and Hasan bin Sabah. As van-Skyhawk notes, an important link was established between the ginānic and qaṣā'id traditions when, in 1961, the 49th Ismāʿīlī Imām termed ʿAllāmah Naṣīr al-Dīn Hunzai's Burushaskī qaṣā'id a "ginān book in [the] Hunza language".

=== Numerology ===
Ismāʿīlīs believe numbers have religious meanings. The number seven plays a general role in the theology of the Ismā'īliyya, including mystical speculations that there are seven heavens, seven continents, seven orifices in the skull, seven days in a week, and so forth.

=== Imamate ===
Classical Ismāʿīlī doctrine holds that divine revelation had been given in six periods (daur) entrusted to six prophets, who they also call Natiq (Speaker), who were commissioned to preach a religion of law to their respective communities. The Imām is the manifestation of truth, and hence he is the path of salvation to God.

Whereas the Natiq was concerned with the rites and outward shape of religion, the inner meaning is entrusted to a Wasi (Representative). The Wasi would know the secret meaning of all rites and rules and would reveal them to small circles of initiates. The Natiq and the Wasi are in turn succeeded by a line of seven Imāms, who guard what they received. The seventh and last Imām in any period becomes the Natiq of the next period. The last Imām of the sixth period, however, would not bring about a new religion of law but rather supersede all previous religions, abrogate the law and introduce din Adama al-awwal ("the original religion of Adam") practised by Adam and the angels in paradise before the fall, which would be without ritual or law but consist merely in all creatures praising the creator and recognizing his unity. This final stage was called the Qiyamah.

=== Pir and Dawah ===
Just as the Imām is seen by Ismailis as the manifestation of the first-created Light, during the period between the Imāmates of Muhammad ibn Ismail and al-Madhi Billah, the relationship between the teacher and the student became a sacred one, and Dai became a position much beyond a normal missionary. Dai passed on the sacred and hidden knowledge of the Imām to the student, who could then use that information to ascend to higher levels. First, the student loved Dai, and from the Dai, he learned to love the Imām, who was but an interceder on behalf of God. In Nizari Ismailism, the head Dai is called the Pir. The Imam is the Pir in Nizari Ismailism.

=== Zāhir ===
In Ismailism, things have an exterior meaning, what is apparent. This is called zāhir.

A fundamental aspect of Ismailism is the co-existence of the physical and the spiritual, the zahir (exoteric) form and the batin (esoteric) essence. The esoteric is the source of the exoteric, and the exoteric is the manifestation of the esoteric. This concept is highlighted in the "Epistle of the Right Path", a Persian-Ismaili prose text from the post-Mongol period of Ismaili history, by an anonymous author.

=== Bātin ===
In Ismailism, things have an interior meaning that is reserved for a special few who are in tune with the Imām or are the Imām himself. This is called bātin.

=== 'Aql ===
As with other Shia, Ismāʿīlīs believe that the understanding of God is derived from the first light in the universe, the light of 'Aql, which in Arabic roughly translates as 'Intellect' or to 'bind' (Latin: Intellectus). It is through this Universal Intellect ('aql al-kull) that all living and non-living entities know God, and all of humanity is dependent and united in this light. Contrastingly, in Twelver thought this includes the Prophets as well, especially Muhammad, who is the greatest of all the manifestations of 'Aql.

God, in Ismaʻili metaphysics, is seen as above and beyond all conceptions, names, and descriptions. He transcends all positive and negative qualities, and knowledge of God as such is above all human comprehension.

For the Shia, the Light (nur) of the Imamate is the Universal Intellect, and consequently, the Imam on earth is the focus of manifestation (mazhar) of the Intellect.

== Acts of worship ==
=== Approach to the traditional five pillars of Islam ===
Isma'ilism has some difference. The Nizari Ismaili Muslims are strongly encouraged to pray what is known as the Du'a (a specific Nizari Ismaili prayer) three times a day. Salah in other forms are not obligatory, but Ismailis can offer them as well.

Zakat or charity in Isma'ilism resembles the Zakat of other Muslims. Along with zakat, Isma'ilis pay a tithe, a percentage of their asset to the Ismaili Imamate for use in development projects in the eastern world, to benefit Isma'ilis and have grown beyond that mission to encompass projects in areas where there are many faiths and ethnicities and where Ismailis do not live. The zakat rates historically differed depending on the asset type: 2.5% of animals, 5% of minerals, and 10% of crops. Among Khoja Ismailis, the zakat is 12.5% of cash income and among other Ismailis of Iran, Syria, Central Asia, and China, the zakat is 10% of cash income and other %s of non-cash assets like crops and livestock.

In terms of fasting (sawm) during Ramadan and at other times, the Nizari and Musta'ali sects believe in a metaphorical instead of literal meaning of fasting. The literal meaning is that one must fast as an obligation, such as during Ramadan, and the metaphorical meaning is seeking to attain the Divine Truth and striving to avoid worldly activities which may detract from this goal. In particular, Isma'ilis believe that the esoteric meaning of fasting involves a "fasting of the soul", whereby they attempt to purify the soul simply by avoiding sinful acts and doing good deeds. In addition, the Nizari also fast on "Shukravari Beej" which falls on a Friday that coincides with the New Moon.

Many Ismaili sects do not subscribe to mainstream Islamic beliefs regarding the Hajj, considering it instead to metaphorically mean visiting the Imam himself, that being the greatest and most spiritual of all pilgrimages. Since the Druze do not follow shariah, they do not believe in a literal pilgrimage to the Kaaba in Mecca as other Muslims do, while the Mustaali (Bohras) still hold on to the literal meaning as well, performing hajj to the Ka'aba and also visiting the Imam (or in a secluded time, the Dai, who is the representative or vicegerent of the Imam) to be Hajj-e Haqiqi.

=== Additional Isma'ili pillars ===
Beyond the traditional five pillars of worship in Islam, Isma'ilis observe an additional two pillars, the first being taharah, which translates from Arabic as "purity." Similar to the more general concept of ritual purity in Islam, taharah denotes a pure soul and includes bodily purity and cleanliness; without taharah of the body, clothes, and ma'salla, prayers are not believed to be accepted.

For the Isma'ilis, jihad is the last of the Seven Islamic Pillars, and for them it means a struggle against one's own soul; striving toward righteousness.

=== Walayah ===
Another central act of worship for Ismailis is walayah, which translates from Arabic as "guardianship" and denotes "Love and devotion for God, the Prophets, the Aimmat and Imām uz Zaman, and Dai." It also denotes Ta'at (following every order without protest, but with one's soul's happiness, knowing that nothing is more important than a command from God and that the command of His vicegerents is His Word). In Ismāʿīlī doctrine, God is the true desire of every soul, and he manifests himself in the forms of Prophets and Imāms; to be guided to his path, one requires a messenger or a guide: a Dai. For the true mawali of the Imam and Dai, heaven is made obligatory. And only with this crucial walayat, they believe, will all the other pillars and acts ordained by Islam be judged or even looked at by God.

== Branches ==
Branching of Ismāʿilism within Shia Islam at a glance.

=== Nizari ===
The largest part of the Ismāʿīlī community, the Qasim-Shahi Nizari Ismāʿīlīs, today accept Prince Rahim Aga Khan V as their 50th Imām,. The 46th Ismāʿīlī Imām, Aga Hassan ʻAlī Shah, fled Iran in the 1840s after being blamed for a failed coup against the Shah of the Qajar dynasty. Aga Hassan ʻAlī Shah settled in Mumbai in 1848.

==== Islamic marriage contract reforms by the Aga Khan III ====
===== History =====
The Nizari Ismaili Imams (known as the Aga Khans since the 18th century have used their power to institute reforms that affected personal lives of men and women in the community. Aga Khan III, the 48th Nizari Ismaili Imam, was passionate in this movement. He came into his role at an early age, due to his father's early death, so his mother, Lady Ali Shah, played an influential role during his early years. The influence of women during his rule continued in his later years with his wife Umm Habiba. Imam Aga Khan III ruled from 1885 to 1957 and the 49th Imam, his grandson, Imam Aga Khan IV ruled from 1957 to 2025. A majority of Aga Khan III's efforts sought to reform Ismaili marriage contract laws which have significantly impacted women within the Nizari Ismaili community.

===== Reforms (on marriage, divorce, segregation, and education) =====
The focus of Imam Aga Khan III's message was to promote the idea that women were free and independent. In a message to his followers in 1926, he proclaimed that:

I do not want Ismaili women dependent on anyone—their parents, husbands, or anyone except God...

He encouraged women to participate in social and political affairs and criticized veiling as well as gender segregation, including the acts of Pardah (masking of oneself from the public) and zenana (restraint on women from leaving the home).

Aga Khan III believed economic independence was key to achieving this equality and freedom. By becoming educated and earning their own livelihood, women would no longer be a burden on their parents or spouses. He proclaimed:

I am trying to guide our young women's lives into entirely new channels. I want to see them able to earn their livings in trades and professions, so that they are not economically dependent on marriage, nor a burden on their fathers and brother[s].

In effect, marriage would no longer be imposed on women due to economic necessity. The Aga Khan III realized that education was at the forefront of this reform and encouraged parents who only had enough money to send one child to school to send their daughters. This advocacy for education was not limited to elementary literacy. To ensure girls had access to education, there was a minimum marriageable age instituted (for both boys and girls) and child marriage was banned. Moreover, marriage against the will of the bride was outlawed as brides were to sign their marriage contracts according to their choice. Other reforms in marriage laws included decisions on polygamy and divorce. In 1905, polygamy was permitted with the condition of the "maintenance of the first wife" and later that was changed to only be allowed for specific reasons. In 1962, polygamy was outlawed within the Nizari Ismaili community. Women were allowed to divorce their husbands and for a husband to divorce his wife, he was required to stand before a council which ultimately decided whether the divorce was granted or denied. Additionally, Aga Khan III took efforts to eliminate and mitigate the stigma around divorces and divorced women.

===== Barriers to realization of reforms =====
A discrepancy exists between the rights offered to women through these reforms and the actual realization of the practice of those rights. Cultural norms and views continue to guide many members of the community who criticize the reforms as being influenced from western values. The Aga Khan responded to this critique by claiming that:

While the words of the Koran remain the same, every generation, every century, every period must have a new and different interpretation of the past, otherwise Islam will die and will not survive the competition of some healthy less rigid competitors.

Additional barriers to practice of reforms include the fact that the councils implementing the forms are often majority male who may still adhere to patriarchal norms. The laws of the countries in which Ismaili women reside also impact the implementation of reforms. Sharia law, common in most Sunni majority countries, is often in contrast to the Ismaili reforms and so residents of these countries must adhere to the country's rules and regulations. The situation of Ismaili women depends on factors including their government and its laws, economic ability, resource availability, and global conditions.

=== Muhammad-Shahi Nizari/Mumini ===
The offshoot of the Muhammad-Shahi or Mumini Nizari Ismailis who follow the elder son of Shams al-Din (Nizari) Muḥammad d. 1310, the 28th Qasim-Shahi Imam, named ʻAlāʼ ad-Dīn Mumin Shāh d. 1337 (26th Imam of the Muhammad-Shahi or Mumini Nizari Ismailis) and his son Muhammad Shah d 1404, the twenty-seventh Imam. They follow this line of Imams until the disappearance of the 40th Imam al-Amir Muhammad al-Baqir in 1796 when they lost contact with him while he resided in India (The Imam Baqir ziarat in Chipurson Valley, Hunza could be related to this imam not 5th Imam Baqir). In 1887 the bulk of this group joined the Qasim-Shahi Nizaris led by Aga Khan III (This event correlates to conversion of Ismailis in Gilgit-Baltistan at the hand of so called Dai Abdus Samad. Many ismailis converted to Twelver Shias who considered the new teachings divergent from mainstream teachings expressed in Quran and Hadith ie Namaz, Fasting, usage of mosque etc). There are 15,000 followers of this line of Nizari Imams in Syria today, locally called the Jafariyah who follow the Shafi'i Fiqh in the absence of their Imam.

There is also a historical dispute as to whether Imam Qasim Shah was a brother or a paternal uncle to ʻAlāʼ ad-Dīn Mumin Shāh. The most famous Imam of this line of Nizari Imams was Shah Tahir bin Radi al-Din II al-Husayni ad-Dakkani, the 31st Imam who died in 1549. He was famous for converting the sultan of the Ahmadnagar Sultanate Burhan Nizam Shah I to Shia Islam. His father the 30th Imam Radi al-Din II bin Tahir who died in 1509, came from Sistan to Badakshan and established his rule of the region. He was killed and a regional Timurid dynasty ruler Mirza Khan established his rule over the region.

=== Musta'ali ===
In time, the seat for one chain of Dai was split between India and Yemen as the community split several times, each recognizing a different Dai. Today, the Dawoodi Bohras, which constitute the majority of the Mustaali Ismāʿīlī accept Mufaddal Saifuddin as the 53rd Dāʿī al-Muṭlaq. The Dawoodi Bohras are based in India, along with the Alavi Bohra. Minority groups of the Sulaymani, however, exist in Yemen and Saudi Arabia. In recent years, there has been a rapprochement between the Sulaymani, Dawoodi, and Alavi Mustaali sub-sects.

The Mustaali sects are the most traditional of the three main groups of Ismāʿīlī, maintaining rituals such as prayer and fasting more consistently with the practices of other Shia sects. It is often said that they resemble Sunni Islam even more than Twelvers do, though this would hold true for matters of the exterior rituals (zahir) only, with little bearing on doctrinal or theological differences.

=== Dawoodi Bohra ===
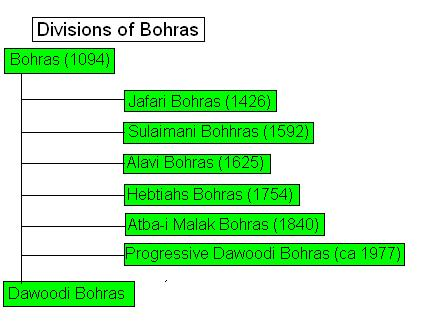
The divisions of the Mustaali, sometimes referred to as Bohras

The Dawoodi Bohras are a very close-knit community who seeks advice from Dai on spiritual and temporal matters.

Dawoodi Bohras is headed by the Dāʻī al-Mutlaq, who is appointed by his predecessor in office. The Dāʻī al-Mutlaq appoints two others to the subsidiary ranks of māzūn (Arabic Maʾḏūn مأذون) "licentiate" and Mukāsir (Arabic: مكاسر). These positions are followed by the rank of ra'sul hudood, bhaisaheb, miya-saheb, shaikh-saheb, and mulla-saheb, which are held by several of Bohras. The 'Aamil or Saheb-e Raza who is granted the permission to perform the religious ceremonies of the believers by the Dāʻī al-Mutlaq and also leads the local congregation in religious, social, and community affairs, is sent to each town where a sizable population of believers exists. Such towns normally have a masjid (commonly known as a mosque) and an adjoining jamaa'at-khaana (assembly hall) where socio-religious functions are held. The local organizations which manage these properties and administer the social and religious activities of the local Bohras report directly to the central administration of the Dāʻī al-Mutlaq.

While the majority of Dawoodi Bohras have traditionally been traders, it is becoming increasingly common for them to become professionals. Some choose to become Doctors, consultants or analysts as well as a large contingent of medical professionals. Dawoodi Bohras are encouraged to educate themselves in both religious and secular knowledge, and as a result, the number of professionals in the community is rapidly increasing. Dawoodi Bohras believe that the education of women is equally important as that of men, and many Dawoodi Bohra women choose to enter the workforce. Al Jamea tus Saifiyah (The Arabic Academy) in Mumbai, Surat, Nairobi and Karachi is a sign to the educational importance in the Dawoodi community. The academy has an advanced curriculum that encompasses religious and secular education for both men and women.

Today there are approximately one million Dawoodi Bohra. The majority of these reside in India and Pakistan, but there is also a significant diaspora residing in the Middle East, East Africa, Europe, North America and the Far East.

The ordinary Bohra is highly conscious of his identity, and this is especially demonstrated at religious and traditional occasions by the appearance and attire of the participants. Dawoodi Bohra men wear a traditional white three-piece outfit, plus a white and gold cap (called a topi), and women wear the rida, a distinctive form of the commonly known burqa which is distinguished from other forms of the veil due to it often being in color and decorated with patterns and lace. The rida's difference from the burqa, however, is significant beyond just the colour, pattern, and lace. The rida does not call for covering of women's faces like the traditional veil. It has a flap called the 'pardi' that usually hangs on the back like the hood of a jacket but it is not used to conceal the face. This is representative of the Dawoodi Bohra community's values of equality and justice for women, which they believe, is a tenet of the Fatimid Imamate's evolved understanding of Islam and the true meaning of women's chastity in Islam. The Dawoodi Bohra community also do not prevent their women from coming to mosques, attending religious gatherings or going to places of pilgrimage. It is often regarded as the most peaceful sect of Islam and an example of true Sufism; it has been critically acclaimed on several occasions even by Western governments such as those of the United Kingdom, Germany, Sweden, and particularly the United States for its progressive outlook towards gender roles, adoption of technology, promotion of literature, crafts, business and secular values. However, the Dawoodi Bohras are highly single-minded about inter-caste or inter-faith marriage. They do not oppose it but do not encourage it either. If a Dawoodi Bohra member does marry into another caste or religion, he or she is usually advised to ask his or her spouse to convert to Islam and, specifically, into the community.

They believe that straying away from the community implies straying away from Ma'ad – the ultimate objective of this life and the meaning of the teachings of Islam, which is to return to where all souls come from and re-unite with Allah. Besides, converting someone to Islam has high spiritual and religious significance as doctrines espouse that making someone a Muslim or Mu'min confers the Sawab (the reward of good deeds) equivalent to that of 40 Hajjs and 40 Umrahs (visiting Mecca and the Kaaba during days other than that of Hajj).

The position of Da'i al-Mutlaq is currently disputed after the demise of the 52nd Da'i al-Mutlaq of the Dawoodi Bohra community, Mohammed Burhanuddin. Two claimants emerged for the position of 53rd Da'i al-Mutlaq, Mufaddal Saifuddin and Khuzaima Qutbuddin, and the Bombay High Court has ruled in the favour of Mufaddal Saifuddin as the righteous successor of the community. Qutbuddin has since died and appointed his son Taher Fakhruddin as his successor.

Besides speaking the local languages, the Dawoodis have their own language called Lisānu l-Dāʻwat "Tongue of the Dāʻwat". This is written in the Persian alphabet but is derived from Urdu, Gujarati, and Arabic and Persian.

=== Sulaymani ===
Founded in 1592, the Sulaymani are mostly concentrated in Yemen with 200,000 members but are also found in Pakistan and India. The denomination is named after its 27th Daʻī, Sulayman bin Hassan. They are referred to and prefer to be referred to as Ahle-Haq Ismaʻilis and Sulaymanis and not with the Bohras suffix.

The total number of Sulaymanis currently are around 700,000, mainly living in the eastern district of Jabal Haraz in northwest Yemen and in Najran, Saudi Arabia. Beside the Banu Yam of Najran, the Sulaymanis are in Haraz, among the inhabitants of the Jabal Maghariba and in Hawzan, Lahab and Attara, as well as in the district of Hamadan and in the vicinity of Yarim.

In India there are between 3000 and 5000 Sulaymanis living mainly in Vadodara, Hyderabad, Mumbai and Surat. In Punjab, Pakistan, there is a well-established Sulaymani community in Sind. Some ten thousand Sulaymanis live in rural areas of Punjab known to the Sulaymani as Jazeera-e Sind; these Sulaymani communities have been in the Jazeera-e Sind from the time of Fatimid Imam-Caliph al-Mu'izz li-Din Allah when he sent his Daʻīs to Jazeera-e Sind.

There are also some 900–1000 Sulaymanis mainly from South Asia scattered around the world, in the Persian Gulf States, United States, Canada, Thailand, Australia, Japan and the United Kingdom.

=== Alavi Bohra ===
The ʻAlavi Bohras, popularly and incorrectly known as Alya Bohras, follow a different line of succession of Duʼaat (missionaries) from the 29th daʼi onwards after the split from Daʼudi Bohras in Ahmedabad in 1621 CE. They believe the rightful daʼi was a grandson of the 28th daʼi named ʻAli Shams al-Din b. Ibrahim (d. 1046 AH/1637 CE). They are named after this ʻAli, calling themselves ʻAlavis, and their mission ad-Daʼwat ul-Haadiyat ul-ʻAlaviyah. Three daʼis later, in 1110 AH/1699 CE, the seat of the ʻAlavi Daʼwat was moved from Ahmedabad to Vadodara by 32nd daʼi, acting on the will of 31st daʼi (except for a brief interlude in Surat for 20 years 1158–1178 AH/1745–1764 CE). Since then Vadodara remains the headquarters of the ʻAlavis to this day. The ʻAlavi Bohras have a library of 450 Ismaʻili manuscripts, some up to 500 years old, at their centre in Vadodara.

Currently, ʻAlavi Bohras are a close-knit organized community numbering approximately 8000, with the majority of them settled in Vadodara, where they have their own locality. They have their own masjids and musafirkhanas in places like Mumbai, Surat, Ahmedabad, Nadiad in India. Some have migrated to the United States, United Kingdom, Australia, Canada, UAE and Europe. Like majority of Bohra communities, ʻAlavi Bohras are mostly traders and dominate the optical and furniture market in Vadodara. They are now increasingly venturing into professions such as law, medicine, engineering, business management, computer sciences. Beings Ismaʻili-Taiyebis they follow strictly Fatimid spiritual hierarchical set-up, law, dress code, customs, beliefs, eating habits, lifestyle, ethics and customary traditions, etc.

While lesser-known and smallest in number, Alavi Bohras have their spiritual and temporal head as the 45th dāʿī al-muṭlaq, Haatim Zakiyuddin. The doctrines of Alavi Bohras is centered on the recognition of the Imam. It continues to be the most important foundation among Bohras. In fact, dai al-mutlaq acts as a direct representative of the concealed Imam as he receives required guidance from him. During this time of the concealment of 21st Fatimid Imam at-Taiyeb and his progeny, the religious hierarchy of the Alavi Bohras is headed by the Dāʻī al-Mutlaq, who is appointed by his predecessor in office and similar as of Dawoodi Bohra.

=== Hebtiahs Bohra ===
The Hebtiahs Bohra are a branch of Mustaali Ismaili Shia Islam that broke off from the mainstream Dawoodi Bohra after the death of the 39th Da'i al-Mutlaq in 1754.

=== Atba-i-Malak ===
The Atba-i Malak jamaat (community) are a branch of Mustaali Ismaili Shia Islam that broke off from the mainstream Dawoodi Bohra after the death of the 46th Da'i al-Mutlaq, under the leadership of Abdul Hussain Jivaji. They have further split into two more branches, the Atba-i-Malak Badar and Atba-i-Malak Vakil.

=== Progressive Dawoodi Bohra ===
The Progressive Dawoodi Bohra is a reformist sect within Musta'li Ismai'li Shia Islam that broke off circa 1977. They disagree with mainstream Dawoodi Bohra, as led by the Da'i al-Mutlaq, on doctrinal, economic and social issues.

=== Druze ===
While on one view there is a historical nexus between the Druze and Ismāʿīlīs, any such links are purely historical and do not entail any modern similarities, given that one of the Druze's central tenets is trans-migration of the soul (reincarnation) as well as other contrasting beliefs with Ismāʿīlīsm and Islam. Druze is an offshoot of Ismailism. Many historical links do trace back to Syria and particularly Masyaf. The Druze faith is often classified as a branch of Isma'ili; although according to various scholars Druze faith "diverge substantially from Islam, both Sunni and Shia". The Druze faith further split from Isma'ilism as it developed its own unique doctrines, and finally separated from both Ismāʿīlīsm and Islam altogether; these include the belief that the Imam Al-Ḥākim bi-Amr Allāh was God incarnate.

Even though the faith originally developed out of Isma'ilism, most Druze no longer consider themselves Muslims, Druze also are not considered Muslims by those belonging to orthodox Islamic schools of thought (see Islam and Druze). Ibn Taymiyyah also pointed out that Druze were not Muslims, and neither 'Ahl al-Kitāb (People of the Book) nor mushrikin, rather they were kuffār (Infidel).

=== Satpanth ===
Satpanth is a subgroup of Nizari Ismailism and Ismaili Sufism formed by conversions from Hinduism 700 years ago by Pir Sadardin (1290–1367) and 600 years ago in the 15th century by his grandson Pir Imam Shah (1430–1520), they differ slightly from the Nizari Khojas in that they reject the Aga Khan as their leader and are known more commonly as Imam-Shahi. There are villages in Gujarat which are totally 'Satpanthi' such as Pirana near Ahmedabad where Imam Shah is buried. It is also the older form of Nizari Ismaili practice originating from the Kutch community of Gujarat. Pir Sadardin gave the first converts to Ismailism the name 'Satpanth' because they were the followers of the 'True Path.' They were then given the title of Khoja to replace their title of Thakkar.

=== Extinct branches ===
==== Böszörmény ====
According to the historian Yaqut al-Hamawi, the Böszörmény (Izmaelita or Ismaili/Nizari) denomination of the Muslims who lived in the Kingdom of Hungary in the 10–13th centuries, were employed as mercenaries by the kings of Hungary. However following the establishment of the Christian Kingdom of Hungary their community was either Christianized or became crypto-Muslims by the end of the 13th century and later assimilated into the Bektashi Order following the Ottoman conquest of Hungary.

==== Hafizi ====
This branch held that whoever the political ruler (caliph) of the Fatimid Caliphate was, was also the Imam of the Time, after the reign of Al-Amir, Al-Hafiz was recognized as the Imam of the Time as well as his descendants. The Hafizi Ismaili sect had 26 Imams. The Hafizi sect lived on into the 14th century CE with adherents in Northern Egypt and Syria but had died out by the 15th century CE.

==== Seveners ====
A branch of the Ismāʿīlī known as the Sab'īyah "Seveners" hold that Ismāʿīl was the seventh and final Ismāʿīlī Imam, and that his son, Muhammad ibn Isma'il, would return from Occultation and bring about an age of justice as Mahdi. However, most scholars believe this group is either extremely small or non-existent today. The Qarmatians were the most active branch of the Seveners.

== Ismailism in Shia Islam ==
The Shia belief throughout its history split over the issue of the Imamate. The largest branch is the Twelvers, followed by the Ismailis then the Zaidis and Kaysanite. All the groups follow a different line of Imamate linked together as shown in the chart below.

=== A schematic of the development of important branches ===
Abd al-Muttalib
Abi Talib
Imâm Ali ibn Abi Talib
Imâm Hasan ibn Ali
2. Imâm Husayn ibn Ali
3. Ali ibn Husayn Zayn al-Abidin
4. Muhammad al-Baqir
Imamate-Shia doctrine
5. Ja'far al-Sadiq

6. Ismāʿīl ibn Jaʿfar al-Mubārak	Musa al-Kadhim
8. Ahmad al-Wafi (ʻAbdullāh bin Muhammad); (incorrectly identified as ʿAbdallāh ibn Maymūn al-Qaddāḥ)	7. Muhammad ibn Isma'il; (incorrectly identified as Maymūn al-Qaddāḥ)	Ali al-Ridha
9. Takî Muhammad (ʿAhmad ibn ʿAbd Allâh); (incorrectly identified as the son of ʿAbdallāh ibn Maymūn al-Qaddāḥ)	Ismailiyya/Imamah (Batiniyya Ismailiyya)	Muhammad al-Jawad
10. Radî/Zakî ʿAbd Allâh; (Husayn bin ʿAhmad)	Hamdan Qarmat of Kufa
11. Abû Muhammad Ali; ʿAbd Allâh al-Mahdī bi l-Lāh	Abu Sa'id Hasan ibn Bahram al-Jannabi
Gnosticism	Fatimids	Qarmatians (Sevener)
Divine call	16. Dâʼî-Âʼzam Târiqʼûl-Hâkim; Abū ʿAlī Manṣūr bi-AmrʿAllâh
Hamza	17. ʻAlī az-Zāhir li-A'zaz li Din-illah	Twelvers
Al-Muqtana	18. Dâʼî-Âʼzam Abû Tamîm; Maʼadd al-Mûstansir bi l-Lāh
Epistles of Wisdom	19. Imâm Abû'l-Qâsim; ʿAhmad al-Mustâʻlî	19. Abū Manṣūr Nizār; al-Muṣṭafá li-Dīnʼil-Lāh	Nasir Khusraw al-Qubadiani
Druses	Musta'li	Nizari	Pamir Alevis
Hafizi Ismaʻilism (Al-Hafiz)	Tayyibi Ismaʻilism (At-Tayyib Abu'l-Qasim)	Nizari Ismaili state (Hassan-i Sabbah)	Nizari Imamate (Aga Khans)
Sulaimani Bohra	Dawoodi Bohra	Assassins	Khojas
Hebtiahs Bohra	Atba-î Malak Bohra	Sunni Bohra	Progressive Dawoodi Bohra
Alavi Bohra	Jâ'farî Bohra	Patani Bohras	Satpanth

== See also ==
- Banu Yam
- Böszörmény
- Brethren of Purity
- Fatimid Caliphate
- Ghulat
- Hosay
- Khoja
- List of extinct Shia sects
- List of Ismaili castles
- List of Isma'ili imams
- List of Isma'ili missionaries
- List of the Order of Assassins
- Nasir al-Din Nasir Hunzai
- Nasir Khusraw
- Nizari Ismaili state
- Pamir Ismaʻilis
- Satpanth
