= Atba-e-Malak =

Branch of Shi'a Islam

The Atba-e-Malak community are a branch of Musta'li Isma'ili Shi'a Islam that broke off from the mainstream Dawoodi Bohra after the death of the 46th Da'i al-Mutlaq, under the leadership of Maulana Abdul Hussain Jivaji in 1890. They are based in Nagpur in India. Many of the community members live in Mahdi Bagh, Nagpur. They are also present in Andhra Pradesh and Telangana states.

There are several hundred followers of this branch of Islam. They have further split into two more branches:

Atba-e-Malak Badar, whose current leader is Maulana Muhammad Amiruddin Malak.

Atba-e-Malak Vakil, whose current leader is Maulana Tayyeb.

== Atba-e-Malak Vakil ==
The Atba-e-Malak Vakil is Muslim Shia Isma'ili Tayyibi Dawoodi Bohra sect that firmly believes in the tradition of nass governing the appointment of Saheb-e-Amar (spiritual successor) continuing the succession (silsila). As per the principle of nass, neither Imam nor da'i al-mutlaq can pass away without appointing their successor, but after untimely and sudden demise of the 46th da'i al-mutlaq Syedna Mohammad Badruddin, due to uncertainty and unawareness of nass, the community divided into two. While the majority accepted Abdul Qadir Najmuddin as 47th Da'i al-Mutlaq, a small community, concentrated in Nagpur, instead turned to Abdul Qadir Ebrahimji as his mansus (successor) or vakil (guarantor), becoming the Atba-e-Malak Vakil.

The leader of the community is titled the Sahab-e-Amar (the one with authority) and the current Sahab-e-Amar is Tayyeb bin Razzak. Like mainstream Dawoodi Bohras, their main religious scriptures are the Qur'an and nasihat, which are works written by Syedi Sadiqali during the period of 42nd and 44th da'i al-mutlaqs, and similar to all other Tayyibi Shi'as, they have seven pillars of Islam, namely tahara, namaz, zakat, roza, Hajj, jihad and walaya, defined by batini belief. In their beliefs, the Saheb-e-Amar reinforces and connects with his spiritual lineage to effectively preach, uphold and spread humanitarian values and causes The transfer of the title from father to son must be followed in essence (batin) and not necessarily in a superficial or apparent (zahir) sense.

== History ==
The historical emergence of the Shī‘ah Imāmī Tāyyībī-Mustā‘lī Atba-ī-Malak-Ismā'īlīs

== See also ==
- Alavi Bohra
- Atba-e-Malak Badar
- Dawoodi Bohra
  - Progressive Dawoodi Bohra
- Hebtiahs Bohra
- Sulaymani Bohra
- Sunni Bohra
