= Abdul Hussain Jivaji =

Abdul Hussayn Jivaji (also known as Maulana Malak) was the founder of the Atba-i-Malak branch of Mustaali Ismaili Shi'a Islam.
