= Ali-Illahism =

Shia Islamic syncretic religion of western Iran

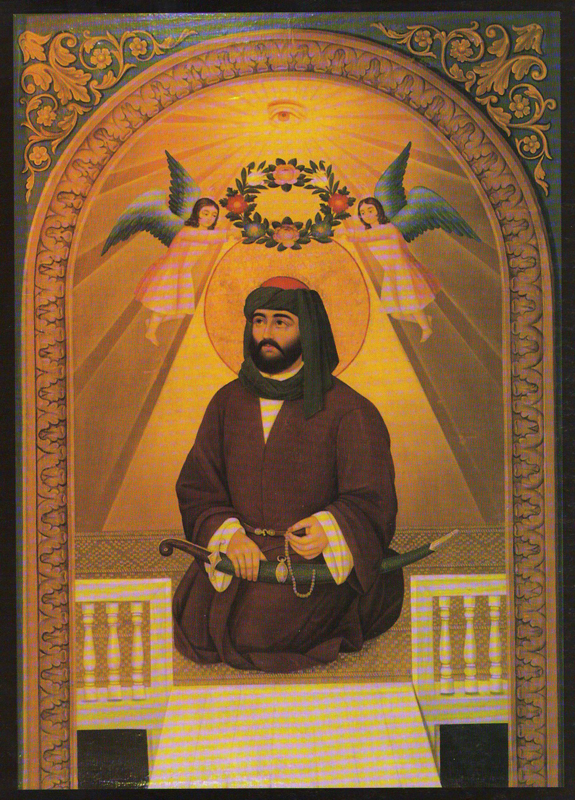
Ali ibn Abi Talib by Hakob Hovnatanian

Ali-Illahism (Persian: علی‌اللّهی; Arabic: علي إلهي) is a syncretic religion practiced in parts of the Luristan region of Iran that combines elements of Shia Islam with older religions. It centers on the belief that there have been successive incarnations of God throughout history: Ali-Illahis reserve particular reverence for Ali, the son-in-law of the Islamic prophet Muhammad, who is considered one of those incarnations. Various rites have been described as "Ali-Illahi," a label also applied to the Yazidis, the Alawites, and other native minority groups whose doctrines and practices are unfamiliar to the surrounding Muslim- and Christian-majority populations. Observers have described it as an agglomeration of the traditions and rituals of several older religions, including Zoroastrianism, based historically on travelogues that were "evident that there is no definite code which can be described as 'Ali-Illahism'." "Ali-Illahism" is sometimes used as an umbrella term for ghulat who venerate or deify Ali, including the Kaysanites, the Alawites, and adherents of Yarsanism. A group of Karapapakhs in Tashkent primarily consists of adherents to the Ali-Illahi faith.

== In Dabestan-e Mazaheb ==
The Dabestan-e Mazaheb (School of Religions), a 17th-century Persian book about South Asian religions, presents the Ali-Illahis as a sect that respected Muhammad and Ali and discarded the Quran, as it had been compiled under Uthman ibn Affan. Its members were said to avoid killing animals and to believe that the laws allowing the killing of some animals had been created by Abu Bakr, Umar, ibn Affan, and their followers.

== See also ==
- Anthropotheism
- Guran (tribe)
- Ghulat
- Kurds
- Yarsanism
- Syncretism
