= Alids =

Descendants of Ali, cousin of Muhammad

Alids العلويين
- Hashemite tribe
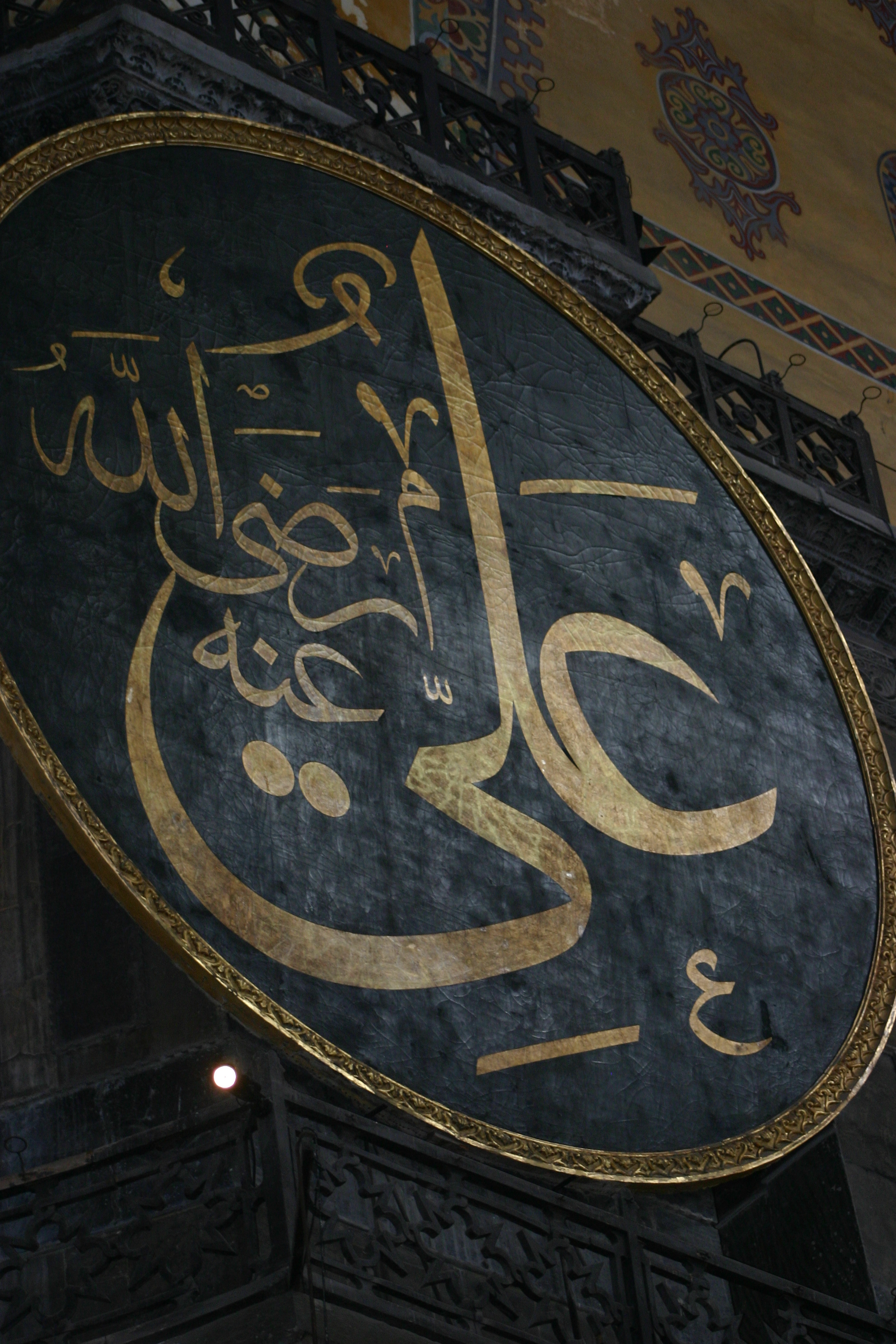
- A medallion bearing the name of Ali inscribed with Islamic calligraphy in Hagia Sophia, Istanbul, Turkey.
- Nisba: al-Alawi
- Location: Islamic world
- Descended from: Ali ibn Abi Talib
- Parent tribe: Banu Hashim
- Branches: Hasanids; Idrisids; Descendants of Muhammad al-Nafs al-Zakiyya; Tabataba'ids; Rassids; Qatadah; Abadilah; Hashemites; Husaynids; Musawids; Jammazids; Uraydids; Alawi Hanafids; Alawi Abbasids
- Religion: Islam

Alids (Arabic: العلويين, romanized: al-ʿAlawiyyīn) are the descendants of Ali, the cousin and son-in-law of the Islamic prophet Muhammad, the fourth Sunni Rashidun caliph and the first Imam in Shia Islam. The two principal branches of the Alid lineage are the Hasanids and Husaynids, named after Hasan and Husayn, the sons of Ali and Fatima, the daughter of Muhammad. The direct line of Alids, beginning with Ali himself, constitutes the Twelve Imams of Twelver Shi'ism, the largest branch of Shia Islam. As the family of Muhammad, they are revered by all Muslims.

== Children of Ali ==
In addition to seventeen daughters, various sources report that Ali had eleven or fourteen, or eighteen sons. His first marriage was to Fatima, daughter of the Prophet Muhammad, who bore Ali three sons, namely, Hasan, Husayn, and Muhsin, though the last one is not mentioned in some sources. Muhsin either died in infancy, or was miscarried after Fatima was injured during a raid on her house to arrest Ali, who had withheld his pledge of allegiance from the first Rashidun caliph Abu Bakr (r. 632–634).

The first report appears in Sunni sources and the latter in Shia sources. Hasan and Husayn are recognized as the second and the third Imams in Shia Islam, their descendants being known as the Hasanids and the Husaynids, respectively. They are revered by all Muslims as the family of Muhammad.

Ali and Fatima had two daughters, Zaynab and Umm Kulthum. Some time after the death of Fatima in 632, Ali remarried and had more children. Among them, the lineage of Ali continued through Muhammad ibn al-Hanafiya, Abbas ibn Ali, and Umar al-Atraf, their descendants were honored by the title Alawi (lit. 'of Ali'). Respectively, they were born to Khawla al-Hanafiyya, Umm al-Banin, and Umm Habib bint Rabi'a (al-Sahba).

== Alids in history ==
=== Umayyads era (r. 661–750) ===
Mu'awiya seized the rule after the assassination of Ali in 661 and founded the Umayyad Caliphate, during which the Alids and their supporters were heavily persecuted. After Ali, his followers (shi'a) recognized as their imam his eldest son Hasan. After his death in 670, they turned to his brother Husayn, but he and his small caravan were massacred by the Umayyads in the Battle of Karbala in 680. Soon followed the Shia uprising of al-Mukhtar in 685 on behalf of Muhammad ibn al-Hanafiya. Many more Shia revolts followed afterward, led not only by the Alids but also by other kinsmen of Muhammad.

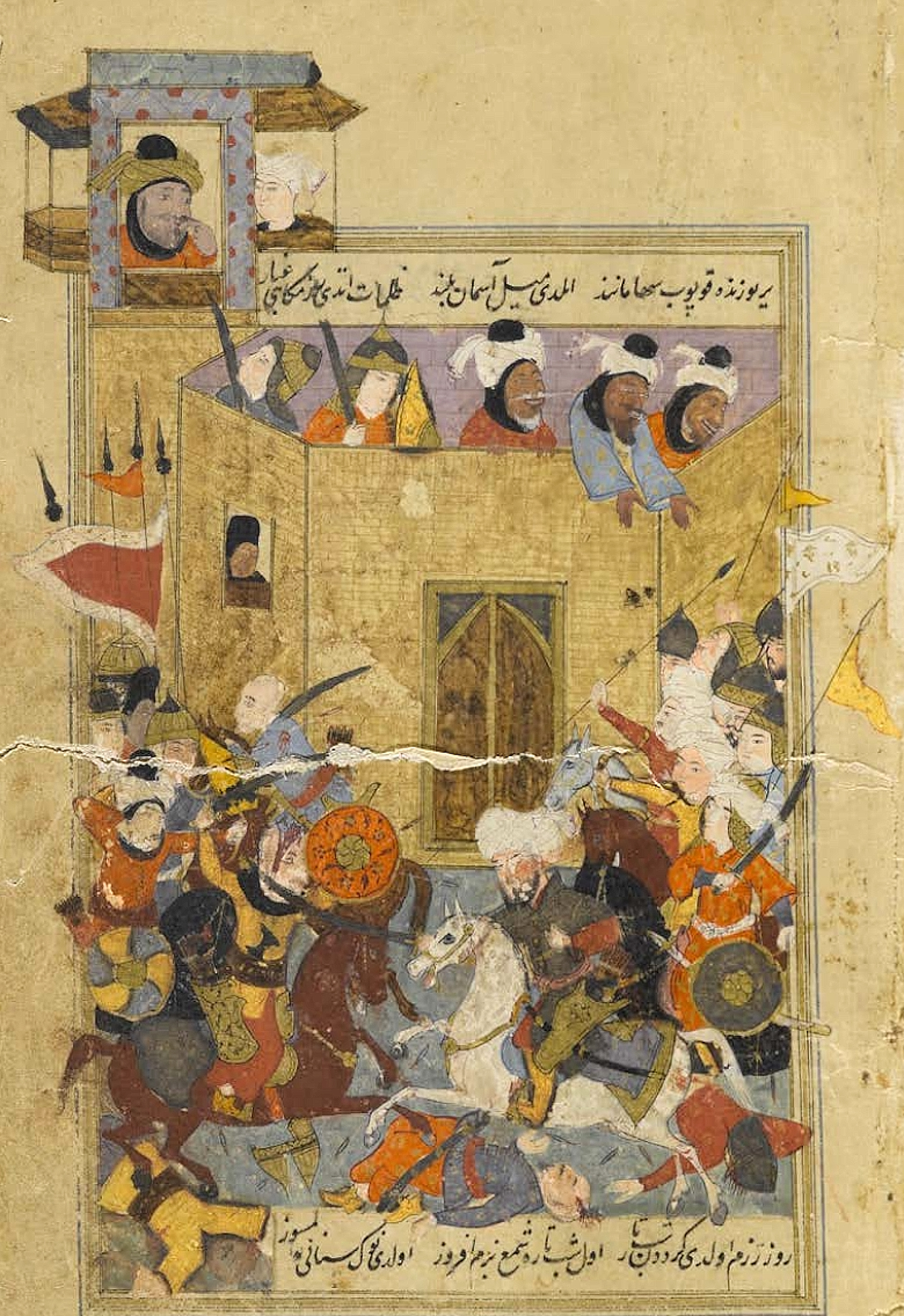
Battle between the ʿAlid forces of Muslim b. Aqil and Umayyad forces of ʿUbaydallah b. Ziyad. Ḥadīḳatü’s Süʾedā, Brooklyn Museum of Art, Brooklyn, 70.143, fol. 324a

The main movements in this period were the now-extinct Kaysanites and the Imamites. Named after a commander of al-Mukhtar, the Kaysanites energetically opposed the Umayyads and were led by various relatives of Muhammad. Their majority followed Abu Hashim, the son of Ibn al-Hanafiya. When Abu Hashim died around 716, this group followed Muhammad ibn Ali ibn Abd-Allah, the great-grandson of Muhammad's uncle Abbas ibn Abd al-Muttalib.

The Kaysanite movement thus aligned itself with the Abbasids, that is, the descendants of Abbas ibn Abd al-Muttalib. On the other hand, the Imamites were led by the quiescent descendants of Husayn through his only surviving son, Ali Zayn al-Abidin (d. 713), their fourth imam. His son Zayd ibn Ali was an exception for he led a failed uprising against the Umayyads around 740. The followers of Zayd went on to form the Zaydites, for whom any learned Hasanid or Husaynid who rose against tyranny was qualified as imam.

=== Abbasids era (r. 750–1258) ===
To overthrow the Umayyads, the Abbasids had rallied the support of the Shia in the name of the Ahl al-Bayt, that is, the family of Muhammad. But many Shias were disillusioned when the Abbasid al-Saffah (r. 750–754) declared himself caliph, as they had hoped for an Alid leader instead. The Abbasids soon turned against their former allies and persecuted the Alids and their Shia supporters.

In response, Shia doctrinally limited its leadership to the Alids, many of whom revolted against the Abbasids, including the Hasanid brothers Muhammad ibn Abd-Allah (d. 762) and Ibrahim. Some Alids instead took refuge in remote areas and founded regional dynasties in the southern shores of the Caspian sea, Yemen, and western Maghreb.

For instance, the revolt of the Hasanid Husayn ibn Ali al-Abid was suppressed in 786 but his brother Idris (d. 791) escaped and founded the first Alid dynasty in Morocco. Similarly, a number of Zaydite rules appeared in northern Persia and in Yemen, the latter of which has survived to the present day.

Some quiescent imams of the Imamites were also probably killed by the Abbasids. For example, the seventh imam, Musa al-Kazim (d. 799), spent years in the Abbasid prisons and died there, possibly poisoned by order of Caliph Harun al-Rashid (r. 786–809), who also had "hundreds of Alids" killed. Caliph al-Ma'mun (r. 813–833) later attempted a reconciliation by appointing Ali al-Rida as heir apparent in 817, the eighth Imam. Other Abbasids revolted in opposition in Baghdad, which forced al-Ma'mun to reverse his policies and Ali al-Rida died around that time, likely poisoned by al-Ma'mun.

Ali al-Hadi (d. 868) and Hasan al-Askari (d. 874), the tenth and eleventh imams of the Imamites, were held in the capital Samarra under strict surveillance. Most Imamite sources report that both were poisoned by the Abbasids. Their followers believe that the birth of their twelfth imam, Muhammad al-Mahdi, was hidden for fear of Abbasid persecution and that he remains in occultation by divine will since 874, until his reappearance at the end of time to eradicate injustice and evil. They became known as the Twelvers.

Meanwhile, the only historic split among the Imamites happened after the death in 765 of their sixth imam, the quiescent Ja'far al-Sadiq, who played a key role in formulating Imamite doctrines. Some claimed that his designated successor was his son Isma'il, who had actually predeceased al-Sadiq. These followers permanently separated and later formed the Isma'ilites. Some of them denied the death of Isma'il but their majority accepted the imamate of his son Muhammad ibn Isma'il.

Muhammad ibn Isma'il's death around 795 was denied by the majority of his followers, who awaited his return as the Mahdi, while a minority traced the imamate in his descendants. The Isma'ilites actively opposed the Abbasids, and their efforts culminated in the establishment of the Fatimid Caliphate (r. 909–1171) in North Africa, although some have questioned the Isma'ilite ancestry of the Fatimid caliphs.

The abortive Zanj rebellion against the Abbasids was ignited in Iraq and Bahrain in the mid-ninth century by Ali ibn Muhammad Sahib al-Zanj, who claimed descent from Abbas ibn Ali. The poetry by descendants of Abbas ibn Ali is collected in al-Awraq, compiled by the Turkic scholar al-Suli (d. 946–947). One of his descendants was Abbas ibn al-Hasan al-Alawi, who reached fame as a poet and scholar during the reigns of Harun al-Rashid and al-Ma'mun.

=== Alid dynasties ===
Several dynasties have claimed descent from Ali, often through his son Hasan. The Hasanid dynasties include the Idrisites and Sharifs of Maghreb in North Africa, and Hammudids in Andalusia, located in modern-day Spain. The Fatimid Caliphate claimed a Husaynid descent.

== Genealogical tables ==
Kilab ibn Murrah	Fatimah bint Sa'd; Banu Azd
Qusayy ibn Kilab	Hubba bint Hulail; Banu Khuza'ah
Abd Manaf ibn Qusai	Atikah bint Murrah; Banu Hawazin
Salma bint Amr; Banu Najjar	Hashim ibn al-Mughira	Qaylah bint Amr; Banu Khuza'ah
Fatimah bint Amr; Banu Makhzum	Abd al-Muttalib ibn Hashim	Asad ibn Hashim
Abu Talib ibn Abd al-Muttalib	Fatimah bint Asad
Abdullah ibn Abd al-Muttalib	Talib ibn Abi Talib	Aqil ibn Abi Talib	Fakhitah bint Abi Talib
Muhammad ibn Abdullah	Ja'far ibn Abi Talib	Jumanah bint Abi Talib
Fatimah al-Zahra bint Muhammad	Ali ibn Abi Talib

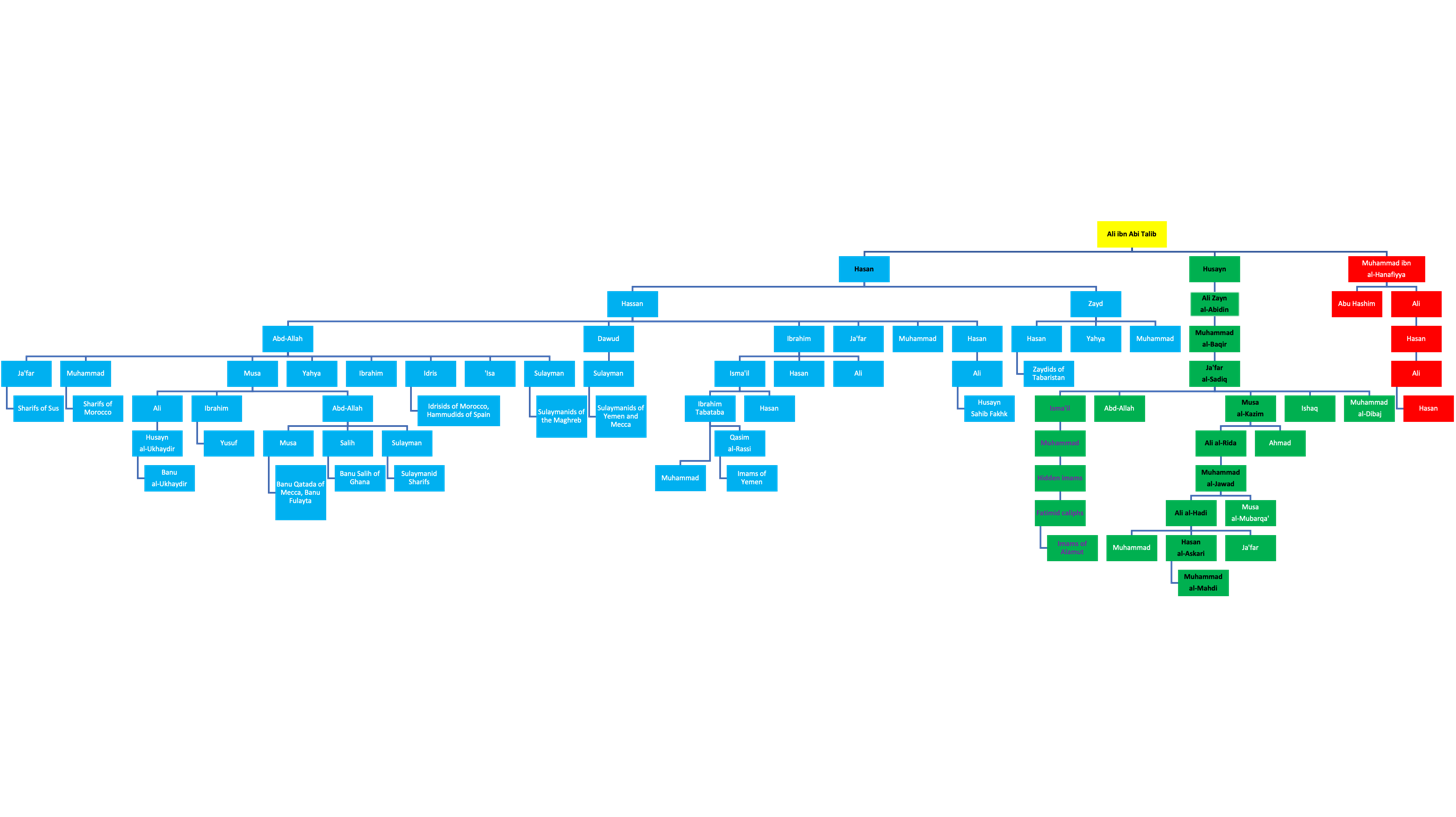
A genealogical table of the Alids, with the Twelver imams denoted in black font and Isma'ili imams in purple font.

Early Genealogy of the Husaynids
See also: Family tree of Husayn ibn Ali

Muhammad (Islamic prophet)	Khadijah bint Khuwaylid
Fatimah	Ali (1st Imam in Shia) (Rashidun Caliph in Sunni)
Muhsin ibn Ali	Hasan ibn Ali (Sunni Rashidun Caliph) (Imam in Twelver/Zaidi and Musta'li Shia)	Husayn ibn Ali (Imam in Twelver/Zaidi and Musta'li/Nizari Shia)	Umm Kulthum bint Ali	Zaynab bint Ali
Shahrbanu	Rubab bint Imra al-Qais	Layla bint Abi Murrah al-Thaqafi	Umm Ishaq bint Talhah
Fatima Sughra	Sakina bint Husayn	Ali al-Asghar ibn Husayn	Sukayna bint Husayn	Ali al-Akbar ibn Husayn	Fatimah bint Husayn
Mother of ‘Umar	Ali ibn Husayn Zayn al-Abidin; 4th Twelver/Zaidi and 3rd Musta'li/Nizari Imam	Fatimah bint Hasan	Jayda al-Sindhi	Ali al-Akbar ibn Husayn
‘Umar al-Ashraf	Muhammad al-Baqir; 5th Twelver and 4th Musta'li/Nizari Imam	Umm Farwah bint al-Qasim (Umm Farwa)	Zayd ibn Ali; 5th Zaidi Imam	Ali al-Asghar ibn Husayn
‘Alī	Hamidah Khatun	Ja'far al-Sadiq; 6th Twelver and 5th Musta'li/Nizari Imam	Fatima bint al-Hussain'l-Athram ibn al-Hasan ibn Ali	Zaynab bint Husayn
al-Ḥasan	Musa al-Kadhim; 7th Twelver Imam	Abdullah al-Aftah (eldest son)	Isma'il ibn Ja'far elder son, but predescesed his father, 6th Musta'li/Nizari Imam	Unknown	Umm Kulthum bint Husayn
‘Alī	Ummul Banīn Najmah	Abd al-Azim al-Hasani claimed as ancestor of the Safavids
al-Nāṣir al-Kabīr	Ali al-Ridha; 8th Twelver Imam	Sabīkah a.k.a. Khayzurān	Muhammad ibn Isma'il; 7th Sevener/Musta'li/Nizari Imam	Fatima
Sumānah	Muhammad al-Jawad; 9th Twelver Imam	Unknown	Ahmad al-Wafi; 8th Musta'li/Nizari Imam	Other issue
Ali al-Hadi; 10th Twelver Imam	Hâdise (Hadīthah) / Suzan (Sūsan) / Sevil (Savīl)	Other issue	Muhammad at-Taqi; 9th Musta'li/Nizari Imam	Unknown
Hasan al-Askari; 11th Twelver Imam	Narjis	Radi Abdullah al-Husayn; 10th Musta'li/Nizari Imam from here descends the Fatimid Caliphs and later the Ismaili Imams
Muhammad al-Mahdi; 12th Twelver Imam

Early Genealogy of the Hasanids

Fatimah bint Muhammad (Family tree)	Ali al-Murtazā ibn Abi Talib (Family tree)	Khawlah bint Ja'far (Family tree)
Hasan al-Mujtabā	al-Husayn (Family tree)	Muhammad ibn al-Hanafiyyah
Zayd ibn Hasan	Bishr ibn Hasan	Qāsim ibn Hasan	Hasan al-Mu'thannā	Abu Bakr ibn Hasan	Fātimah bint Hasan	Ali Zayn al-Abedin	Ali ibn Muhammad	Abu Hashim	Hasan ibn Muhammad
Hasan ibn Zayd	Abd al-Rahman	Muhammad ibn Hasan	Abd Allah ibn Hasan	Talha ibn Hasan	Hasan	Abu Bakr (Family tree)
Hasan (Alavids)	Amr ibn Hasan	Husayn al-Athram	Maymūnah	Umm al-Husayn	Ali	Muhammad ibn Abu Bakr
ʿAbd Allāh al-Kāmīl	Da'wud	Hasan al-Mu'thallath	Ibrāhīm al-Ghamr	Jā`far	Muhammad	Hasan	Al-Qasim ibn Muhammad
ʿAlī al-ʿĀbid	Ismāʿīl al-Dībādj	Hasan	ʿAlī	Muhammad al-Baqir	Umm Farwah bint al-Qasim
Husayn; Sahib Fakhkh	Ibrāhīm Ṭabāṭabā	Hasan	Husayn	'Umar al-Ashraf	Zayd ibn Ali	Jā`far al-Ṣādiq
Muḥammad ibn Ibrāhīm Ṭabāṭabā	al-Qasim ar-Rassi	Ubayd Allah	Yahya ibn Zayd	Īsā Mūʾtam al-Ashbāl (Father of Aḥmad)
Imams of Yemen	Hasan al-Utrush	Ḥasan	Ḥusayn Dhū al-Damʿa
Mūsā al-Djawn	Yahya ibn Abdallah	Ibrahim ibn Abdallah	Idris I of Morocco	Sulayman I of Tlemcen	Muhammad al-Nafs al-Zakiyya	Jā`far	Isa
Ibrahim	Ali	ʿAbd Allāh as-Sālih	Idrisids of Morocco and Hammudids of Spain	Sūlaymānids of the Maghrib	Sharifs of Morocco	Sharifs of Sus	Yahya ibn Umar ibn Yahya ibn Husayn ibn Zayd al-Kūfī
Yūsūf al-Ukhaidhir	Husayn al-Ukhaidhir	Ismāʿīl ibn Jā`far	Abdullah al-Aftah	Musa al-Kazīm	Ishak	Muhammad al-Dibadj
Ismāʿīl (Banu al-Ukhaiḍir)	Sālih (Banu Sālih of Ghana)	Mūsā II (Sharifs of Mecca)	Sūlaymān (Sūlaymānid Sharifs)	Muhammad ibn Ismāʿīl	Muhammad ibn Abdullah	Ali al-Rida	Ahmad
Muhammad ibn Yūsūf	Muḥammad ash-Shāʿīr	Dā'wūd	Muḥammad at-Thāʿīr	Hidden Imams	Muhammad al-Djawad
Yūsūf ibn Muhammad	Husain	ʿAbd Allāh	Fatimid; Caliphs	Musa al-Mubarraqa	Ali al-Hadi
Ismāʿīl ibn Yūsūf	Bū'Hāshīm Muḥammad	Abū Jā`far Muḥammad	Qatada ibn Idris	Imams of Alamut	Muḥammad	Hasan al-Askari	Jā`far
Al-Ḥassan ibn Yūsūf	Bānū Fulayta	Bānū Jā`far	Bānū Qatāda	Muhammad al-Mahdi
Aḥmad ibn al-Ḥassan	Hussein bin Ali
Abu'l-Muqallid Jā`far ibn Aḥmad	Abdullah I (Hashemite King of Jordan)	Ali bin Hussein (King of Hejaz)	Faisal I (King of Syria & Iraq)

== See also ==
- Ibn Inabah
- Umdat al-Talib fi Ansabi Ale Abi Talib
