= Talha (name) =

Talha or Thalha is an Arabic masculine given name, meaning "fruitful tree from heaven". Talha is the name of a well-known sahabi (companion) of the Islamic prophet Muhammad, Talha ibn Ubayd Allah. He is renowned for saving Muhammad's face from an arrow by holding his hand in the way.

== People with this name ==
=== 7th century people ===
- Talha ibn Ubayd Allah (594–656), famous sahabi (companion) of Muhammad
- Uthman ibn Talha, sahabi (companion) of Muhammad
- Abu Talha al-Ansari (died 654), sahabi (companion) of Muhammad
- Umm Ishaq bint Talha ibn Ubayd Allah, daughter of Talha ibn Ubayd Allah and wife of Hasan ibn Ali
- A'isha bint Talha, daughter of Talha ibn Ubayd Allah
- Muhammad ibn Talha (died 656), son of Talha ibn Ubayd Allah
- Ishaq ibn Talha (died 675 or 676), son of Talha ibn Ubayd Allah
- Isa ibn Talha al-Taymi (died c. 690s), son of Talha ibn Ubayd Allah
- Talha ibn Hasan, son of Hasan ibn Ali and his wife Umm Ishaq bint Talha bin Ubayd Allah
- Talha ibn Abd Allah al-Khuza'i (died 684–685), Umayyad military commander

=== Politicians and rulers ===
- Talha ibn Tahir (died 828), Tahirid governor of Khurasan
- Al-Muwaffaq (843–891), full name Abu Ahmad Talha ibn Ja'far, Abbasid prince and military leader
- Talha ibn Abbas (1569–1571), sultan of the Sultanate of Adal in the Horn of Africa
- Talha Jafar (1853–1934), nineteenth century Argobba-Ethiopian rebel and governor
- Khondker M. Talha, ambassador of Bangladesh to France and UNESCO
- Abu Talha (politician) (born 1939), Bangladeshi politician
- Muhammad Talha Mahmood (born 1960), Pakistani senator
- Haniza Mohamed Talha (born 1962), Malaysian politician who served as Member of the Selangor State Executive Council (EXCO)

=== Academia ===
- Parveen Talha (60s), Indian civil servant
- M. Talha ÇİÇEK (born 1982), Turkish History Professor
- Talha Jamal Pirzada (born 1990), Pakistani Chartered Mechanical Engineer
- Talha Iqbal (born 1995), Pakistani Medical Engineer
- Thalha Khan (born 1999), British Physician
- Talha Elahi (born 1995), Australian Engineer

=== Artists and entertainers ===
- Abu Talha Al-Almani (born Denis Cuspert in 1975) (1975–2018), German former rapper and ISIL member
- Syed Talha Ahsan (born 1979), British poet and translator
- Talha Harith (born 1989), Malaysian actor
- Talhah Yunus (born 1996), Pakistani songwriter, rapper, filmmaker and musician
- Talha Anjum (born 1996), Pakistani songwriter, rapper and musician
- Talha Chahour (born 1997), Pakistani actor

=== Athletes ===
- Talha Ahmet Erdem, Turkish world champion judoka
- Talha Jubair (born 1985), Bangladeshi cricketer
- Mohammad Talha (born 1988), Pakistani cricketer
- Tayyip Talha Sanuç (born 1999), Turkish professional footballer
- Talha Talib (born 1999), Pakistani weightlifter
- Talha Ülvan (born 2001), Belgian footballer
- Talha Sarıarslan (born 2004), Turkish professional footballer

== Others ==
- Talha Mosque 11th-century mosque in Yemen
- APC Talha, an armoured personnel carrier (APC) designed and manufactured in Pakistan
- Abu Talha (disambiguation)
- Arabic name
