= Erdem =

Erdem (IPA: [ˈæɾdæm]) is a Turkish and Mongolian masculine name that means "virtue, merit, kind, knowledge".

Erdem may also refer to:

== Given name ==
- Erdem Başçı (born 1966), Turkish economist
- Erdem Helvacıoğlu (born 1975), Turkish musician
- Erdem Moralioğlu (born 1977), Turkish-Canadian fashion designer
- Erdem Özgenç (born 1984), Turkish footballer
- Erdem Türetken (born 1979), Turkish basketball player
- Erdem Erkul, Turkish Executive and Entrepreneur Erdem balik

== Surname ==
- Ali Naili Erdem (born 1927), Turkish lawyer and politician
- Alparslan Erdem (born 1988), Turkish-German footballer
- Arif Erdem (born 1972), Turkish footballer
- Bülent Erdem (born 1948), Turkish fencer
- Can Erdem (born 1987), Turkish footballer
- Kaya Erdem (born 1928), Turkish politician
- Mülayim Erdem (born 1987), Turkish footballer
- Naci Erdem (1931–2022), Turkish footballer
- Nazim Erdem (born 1970), Australian rugby union player
- Reha Erdem (born 1960), Turkish film director and screenwriter
- Sinan Erdem (1927-2003), Turkish volleyball player
- Talha Ahmet Erdem, Turkish judoka with Down syndrome
- Yonca Şevval Erdem (born 1996), Turkish female water polo player
- Zehra Erdem (born 2001), Turkish female badminton player
- Zeynel Abidin Erdem (born 1944), Turkish business tycoon
