= Hasan ibn Ali =

Grandson of Muhammad and the second Shia Imam (625–670)

Hasan ibn Ali حسن ابن علي
- Sayyid Shabāb Ahl al-Janna; Karīm Ahl al-Bayt; Amir al-Mu'minin; Sibt an-Nabi; Al-Mujtaba
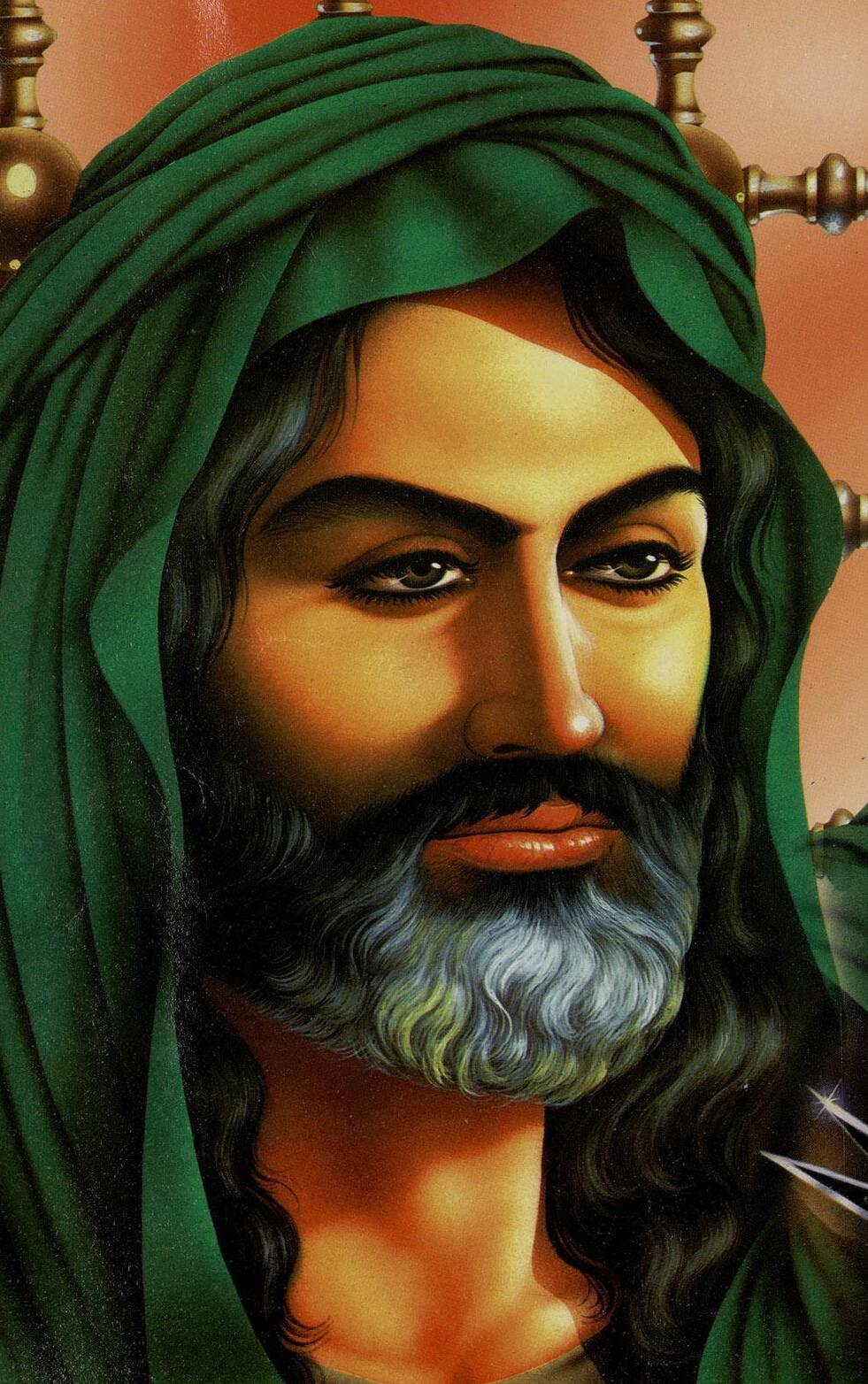
- A conventional artistic depiction of Hasan ibn Ali in the Shia tradition by Abolfazl Mirzabeygi, 1980

Caliph
- Reign: 28 January 661 – c. 10 August 661 (195 days)
- Predecessor: Ali (as Rashidun Caliph)
- Successor: Mu'awiya I (as Umayyad Caliph)

2nd Shia Imam
- In office 28 January 661 – 2 April 670
- Preceded by: Ali
- Succeeded by: Husayn ibn Ali
- Born: 4 March 625 CE (15 Ramadan 3 AH); Medina, First Islamic state
- Died: 5 March 670 CE (aged 45) (7 Safar 50 AH); Medina, Umayyad Caliphate
- Cause of death: Mercury poisoning
- Burial: Al-Baqi Cemetery, Medina
- Spouse: Hafsa bint Abd al-Rahman; Hind bint Suhayl; Ja'da bint al-Ash'ath; Khawla bint Manzur; Umm Bashir bint Abi Mas'ud; Umm Abdullah bint al-Shaleel; Umm Ishaq bint Talha; Asma bint Utarid ibn Hajib; Umm Salma bint Imra' al-Qays
- Issue: Descendants of Hasan: Abd Allah; Abd al-Rahman; Abu Bakr; Amr; Bishr; Hasan; Husayn al-Athram; Muhammad; Qasim; Talha; Fatima; Ruqayya; Umm al-Hasan; Umm al-Husayn; Umm Salama; Zayd
- Tribe: Quraysh (Banu Hashim)
- Father: Ali ibn Abi Talib
- Mother: Fatima bint Muhammad
- Religion: Islam

Hasan ibn Ali (Arabic: حسن ابن علي, romanized: Ḥasan ibn ʿAlī; c. 625 – 2 April 670) was an Alid political and religious leader. The eldest son of Ali and Fatima and a grandson of the Islamic prophet Muhammad, Hasan briefly ruled as caliph from January 661 until August 661. He is considered as the second Imam in Shia Islam, succeeding Ali and preceding his brother Husayn. As a grandson of the prophet, he is part of the ahl al-bayt and the ahl al-kisa, and also participated in the event of the mubahala. Muhammad described him and his brother, Husayn, as the leaders of the youth of paradise.

During the caliphate of Ali (r. 656–661), Hasan accompanied him in the military campaigns of the First Fitna. Following Ali's assassination in January 661, Hasan was acknowledged caliph in Kufa. His sovereignty was not recognized by Mu'awiya ibn Abi Sufyan (r. 661–680), the governor of Syria and a rival claimant to the caliphate, who led an army into Kufa while pressing Hasan for abdication in letters. In response, Hasan sent a vanguard under Ubayd Allah ibn al-Abbas to block Mu'awiya's advance until he arrived with the main army. Meanwhile, Hasan was severely wounded in an abortive assassination attempt by Al-Jarrah Ibn Sinan, a member of the Kharijites, a faction opposed to both Ali and Mu'awiya. This attack demoralised Hasan's army and led to widespread desertion. Ubayd Allah and most of his troops also defected after Mu'awiya bribed him. In August 661, Hasan signed a peace treaty with Mu'awiya on the condition that the latter should rule in compliance with the Quran and the Sunnah, a council should appoint his successor, and Hasan's supporters would receive amnesty. Hasan retired from politics and abdicated in Medina where he died either from illness or poisoning, though the early sources are nearly unanimous that he was poisoned. Mu'awiya is commonly viewed as the instigator in the murder of Hasan, which removed an obstacle to the succession of his son Yazid I (r. 680–683).

Critics of Hasan call his treaty with Mu'awiya an indication of weakness, saying that he intended to surrender from the beginning. Given Mu'awiya's military superiority, supporters of Hasan maintain that his abdication was inevitable after his soldiers mutinied and that he was motivated by the desire for unity and peace among Muslims, which was reportedly predicted by Muhammad in a Sunni hadith. Another Sunni hadith, also attributed to Muhammad, predicted that the prophetic succession would last for thirty years, which may have been interpreted by some early Sunni scholars as evidence that Hasan's caliphate was rightly-guided (rāshid). In Shia theology, the divine infallibility (isma) of Hasan as the second Shia Imam further justified his course of action. As the rightful successor of Muhammad in Shia Islam, Hasan's all-inclusive temporal and religious authority came from divinely-inspired designation (nass), which was not annulled by abdication to Mu'awiya I, who usurped only the temporal authority. The imamate and caliphate are viewed as separate institutions in Shia Islam until such time that God would make the Imam victorious.

== Early life ==
=== Birth ===
Hasan was born in Medina in c. 625. Sources differ on whether he was born in the Islamic months of Sha'ban or Ramadan, though most early works give his birthdate as 15 Ramadan 3 AH (2 March 625), which is annually celebrated by the Shia. Hasan was the firstborn of Muhammad's daughter Fatima and his cousin Ali. Their union holds a special spiritual significance for Muslims, write Nasr and Afsaruddin, and Muhammad said he followed divine orders to marry Fatima to Ali, narrates the Sunni al-Suyuti (d. 1505), among others. Ali reportedly had chosen another name in Sunni sources but deferred to Muhammad who named the child Hasan (lit. 'good, virtuous'). To celebrate his birth, Muhammad sacrificed a ram, while Fatima shaved Hasan's head and donated the weight of his hair in silver.

=== Lifetime of Muhammad ===
Hasan was raised in Muhammad's household until his death, when Hasan was aged seven. Early sources widely report Muhammad's love for Hasan and his brother Husayn, saying that Muhammad allowed the boys to climb on his back while he was prostrate in prayer, and interrupted a sermon to pick up Hasan after he fell. Hasan later recalled an incident where his grandfather took a date from him, and explained to him that receiving alms (sadaqa) was forbidden for his family.

A saying of the prophet (hadith) that was recorded in the canonical Sunni hadith collections Sunan al-Tirmidhi and Sunan ibn Majah names Hasan and Husayn as "the two sayyids (lit. 'chiefs' or 'lords') of the youth in paradise" (Arabic: Sayyidā Shabāb Ahl al-Janna). Madelung adds that this hadith is widely reported, while Veccia Vaglieri (d. 1989) notes that its authenticity was disputed by the Umayyad Caliph Marwan (r. 684–685). The Sunan ibn Majah and the canonical Shia source Kitab al-Irshad narrate the prophetic hadith "He who has loved Hasan and Husayn has loved me and he who has hated them has hated me." Similarly, the Sunan al-Tirmidhi ascribes to Muhammad the saying "Whoever loves me and loves these two [Hasan and Husayn] and loves their mother and father [Fatima and Ali], will be with me in my station on the Day of Resurrection."

==== Mubahala ====
After an inconclusive debate in 10/631-2, Muhammad and the Najranite Christians decided to engage in mubahala, where both parties would pray to invoke God's curse upon the liar. Madelung argues that Muhammad participated in this event alongside Hasan, Husayn, and their parents. This is also the Shia view. In contrast, most Sunni accounts by al-Tabari (d. 923) do not name the participants of the event, while some other Sunni historians agree with the Shia view.

During the event, Muhammad gathered Hasan, Husayn, Ali, and Fatima under his cloak and addressed them as his ahl al-bayt, according to some Shia and Sunni sources, including the canonical Sahih Muslim and Sahih al-Tirmidhi. Madelung suggests that their inclusion by Muhammad in this significant ritual must have raised the religious rank of his family. A similar view is voiced by Lalani.

=== Death of Muhammad and Fatima (632) ===
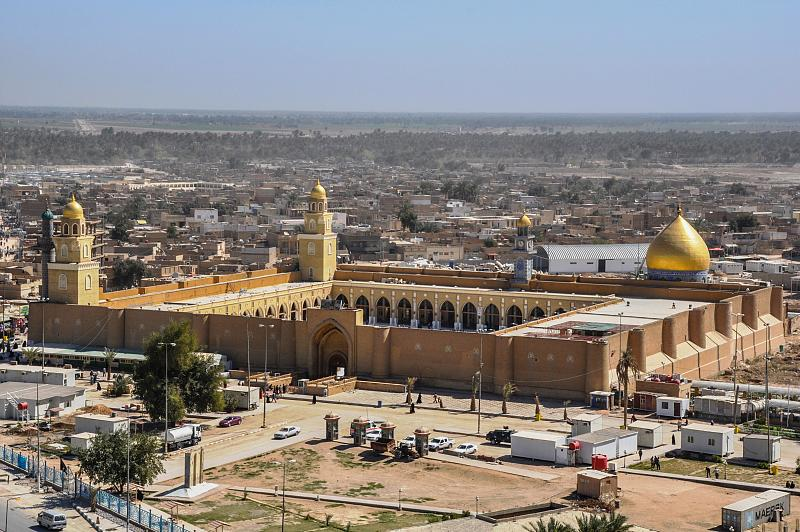
A view of the modern-day Kufa, the headquarters of Hasan, and its Great Mosque, where he gave his inaugural speech

Muhammad died in 11/632 when Hasan was about seven. As his family prepared for the burial, a group of Muslims gathered at the Saqifa and appointed Abu Bakr as Muhammad's successor, in the absence of his family and the majority of the Muhajirun (Meccan Muslims). Ali, Fatima, and some supporters did not recognize the caliphate of Abu Bakr, saying that Muhammad had appointed Ali as his successor, possibly referring to the Event of Ghadir Khumm in 632.

Fatima died also in 632, within six months of Muhammad's death, at the age of about eighteen or twenty-seven years old. Shias hold that she miscarried her child and died from the injuries she suffered in an attack on her house, intended to subdue Ali, at the order of Abu Bakr. These allegations are rejected by Sunnis, who believe that Fatima died from grief after Muhammad's death and that her child died in infancy of natural causes.

== Life under Rashidun Caliphs ==
Iranian Qajar dynasty tapestry, probably a Shia talisman, depicting Ali with Hasan and Husayn (Library of Congress)

=== Caliphates of Abu Bakr, Umar, and Uthman ===
Hasan did not play a major role under the first three caliphs, namely, Abu Bakr (r. 632–634), Umar (r. 634–644), and Uthman (r. 644–656). He might have had a share of five thousand dirhams in Umar's system of state pension. According to Ibn Isfandiyar, Hasan took part in an expedition to Amol (located in Tabaristan) during the caliphate of Umar, though the veracity of such accounts has been questioned by Ahmad Paktchi, Masoud Tareh, and other historians. In contrast, he is said to have participated in the expedition against Tabaristan during Uthman's caliphate. Led by the Kufan governor Sa'id ibn al-As, the expedition advanced through Qumis and Gorgan before reaching Tamisah, a border city between Gorgan and Tabaristan, where Hasan served alongside his brother Husayn, their cousin Ibn Abbas, and prominent companions such as Abd Allah ibn Umar, Abd Allah ibn Amr ibn al-As, and Abd Allah ibn al-Zubayr.

Separately, defying Uthman, Hasan joined his father in bidding farewell to Abu Dharr al-Ghifari (d. 652), who was exiled from Medina after he preached against the misdeeds of the powerful. When Uthman's half-brother al-Walid ibn Uqba was accused of drinking alcohol, Ali asked Hasan to carry out the punishment of forty lashes, though the latter reportedly refused and Abd Allah ibn Ja'far instead administered the penalty. Veccia Vaglieri does not mention any disagreements and writes that Ali meted out the punishment himself. She also suggests that the young Hasan and his brother Husayn lived in a state of obedience to their father Ali, following Ali whenever he opposed Uthman.

In June 656, Uthman was besieged in his home by rebels. Hasan and Husayn were likely wounded while guarding Uthman's house at the request of Ali. In particular, the reports that Hasan was among the defenders are considered numerous and reliable by Madelung. On the final day, however, Hasan and most of the guards are said to have laid down their weapons at Uthman's request. Yet another report states that Hasan arrived at the scene of Uthman's murder in time to identify his assassins. According to Madelung, Hasan later criticised Ali for not doing enough to defend Uthman.

=== Caliphate of Ali ===
Ali was elected caliph after the assassination of Uthman. Immediately after his accession, the new caliph faced a rebellion led by Aisha, a widow of Muhammad and daughter of Abu Bakr, and Talha ibn Ubayd Allah and Zubayr ibn al-Awwam, two companions of Muhammad. Hasan and Ammar ibn Yasir (d. 657) were subsequently sent to Kufa to rally support and raised an army of some 6,000 men. He also helped remove Abu Musa al-Ash'ari from the governorship of Kufa, as the latter continued to hinder Ali's efforts against the rebels. Hasan later fought in the Battle of the Camel (656) against Aisha, Talha, and Zubayr.

Hasan also fought against Mu'awiya ibn Abi Sufyan (r. 661–680) in the Battle of Siffin (657), though Sunni sources do not view him as a prominent participant. Madelung writes that Hasan criticised Ali's alleged aggressive war policy, saying that it stoked division among Muslims. In contrast, the Sunni Ibn 'Abd al-Barr (d. 1071) lists Hasan as a commander at Siffin and the Shia Nasr ibn Muzahim (d. 827–828) narrates that Mu'awiya offered Hasan to switch sides at Siffin but was rejected. Haj-Manouchehri writes that Hasan persuaded some neutral figures to support Ali at Siffin, including Sulayman ibn Surad al-Khuza'i. He adds that Hasan vigorously opposed the arbitration process after Siffin alongside his father. In November 658, Ali placed Hasan in charge of his land endowments.

== Caliphate of Hasan ==
In January 661, Ali was assassinated by the Kharijite Abd al-Rahman ibn Muljam. Hasan was subsequently acknowledged caliph in Kufa, the seat of Ali's caliphate. Madelung writes that Ali had apparently not nominated a successor before his sudden death but had often said that only members of Muhammad's household (ahl al-bayt) were entitled to the caliphate. As Ali's legatee, Hasan must have been the obvious choice for the caliphate. Some Shia reports add that Ali also designated Hasan as his waliu'l amr, thus giving him his own authority to command, and also his waliu'l dam, responsible for punishing his assassin. Some authors have noted that Muhammad's surviving companions were primarily in Ali's army and must have therefore pledged allegiance to Hasan, as evidenced by the lack of any reports to the contrary.

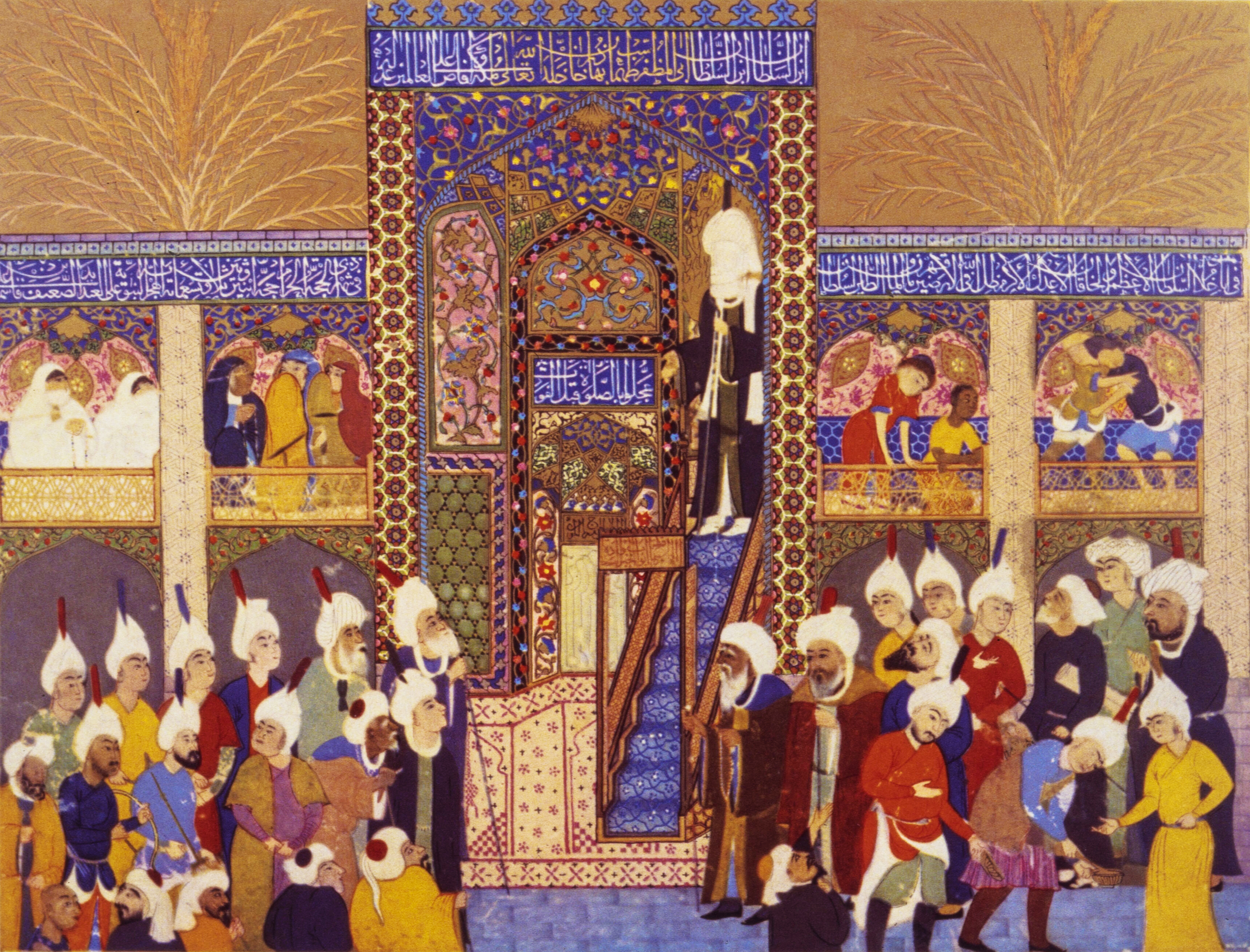
Persian miniature of the inaugural speech of Hasan ibn Ali.

In his inaugural speech at the Great Mosque of Kufa, Hasan praised the ahl al-bayt and quoted verse 42:23 of the Quran:

I am of the Family of the Prophet from whom God has removed filth and whom He has purified, whose love He has made obligatory in His Book when He said, "Whosoever performs a good act, We shall increase the good in it". Performing a good act is love for us, the Family of the Prophet.

Ali's commander Qays ibn Sa'd was the first to pledge his allegiance to Hasan. Qays offered his oath based on the Quran, precedent (sunna), and jihad against those who declared lawful (halal) what was unlawful (haram). Hasan, however, avoided the last condition by saying that it was implicit in the first two. About this episode, Husain Mohammad Jafri (d. 2019) suggests that Hasan was probably already apprehensive about the Kufans' support and wanted to avoid unrealistic commitments. The oath stipulated that people "should make war on those who were at war with Hasan, and should live in peace with those who were at peace with him", writes the Sunni al-Baladhuri (d. 892), adding that this condition astonished the people, who suspected that he intended to make peace with Mu'awiya I. In contrast, Madelung notes that the oath was identical to the one demanded earlier by Ali and denounced by the Kharijites. The view of Maria Massi Dakake is similar.

=== Conflict with Mu'awiya I ===
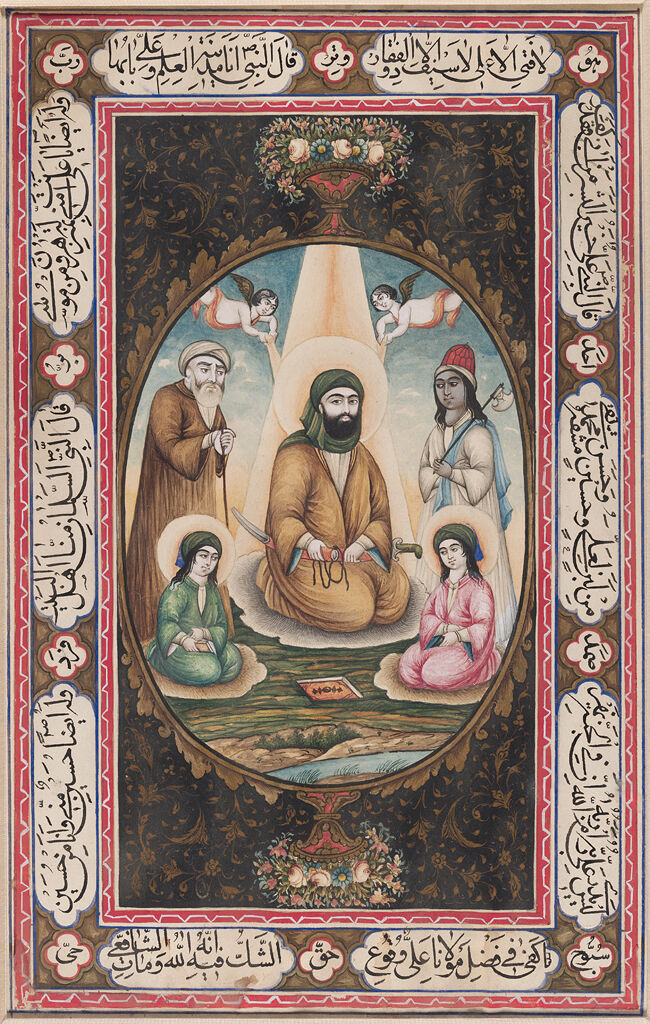
Nineteenth-century painting of Ali (center), Hasan, and Husayn

Having been at war with Ali, Mu'awiya I did not recognise the caliphate of his successor and prepared for war. He marched an army of sixty thousand men through al-Jazira to Maskin, about 50 kilometres (31 mi) north of the present-day Baghdad. Concurrently, Mu'awiya I also corresponded with Hasan, urging him to give up his claim to the caliphate. Jafri suggests that he might have hoped to force Hasan to abdicate or attack the Iraqi forces before they were fortified. Mu'awiya I might have believed that Hasan would remain a threat even if he were defeated and killed, since another Hashemite could continue the fight. If Hasan abdicated in favor of Mu'awiya I, he writes, such claims would have no weight. The view of Momen is similar.

Their letters revisit the succession of Muhammad. Writing under the title Amir al-Mu'minin, Hasan urged Mu'awiya I to pledge allegiance to him, using the same arguments Ali had advanced against Abu Bakr after Muhammad's death. Ali had said that if the Quraysh could successfully claim the leadership because Muhammad belonged to them, then Muhammad's family was the most qualified to lead. Mu'awiya I replied that Muslims were not unaware of the merits of the ahl al-bayt but had selected Abu Bakr to keep the caliphate within the Quraysh. Hasan also wrote that Mu'awiya I had no true merit in Islam and was the son of Muhammad's arch-enemy Abu Sufyan. Mu'awiya I replied that he was better suited for the caliphate because of his age, governing experience, and superior military strength, thus implying that these qualities were more important than religious precedence. Jafri comments that Mu'awiya I's response made explicit the separation of politics and religion, which later became a tenet of Sunni Islam. In contrast, Shia Islam vested all authority in the household of Muhammad.

==== Mobilisation of Iraqi troops ====
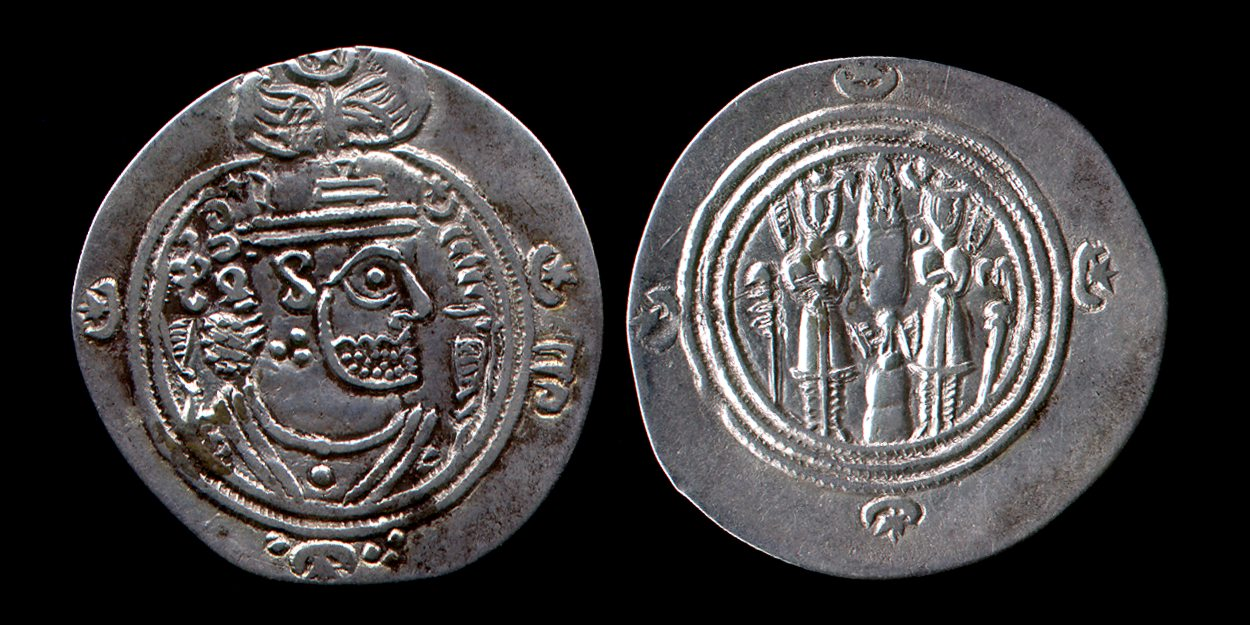
Sasanian-style Coin minted in the present-day Iran in 30 AH (661–662), during Hasan's caliphate. The Arabic phrase lillah (lit. 'for Allah') appears in its margin.

As the news of Mu'awiya I's advance reached Hasan, he ordered his local governors to mobilise and invited the Kufans to prepare for war, "God had prescribed the jihad for his creation and called it a loathsome duty (kurh)", referring to verse 2:216 of the Quran. There was no response at first, possibly because some tribal chiefs were bribed by Mu'awiya I. Hasan's companions now scolded the crowd and inspired them to leave in large numbers for the army campgrounds in Nukhayla. Hasan soon joined them and appointed Ubayd Allah ibn Abbas as the commander of a vanguard of twelve thousand men tasked with holding Mu'awiya I back in Maskin until the arrival of Hasan's main army. Ubayd Allah was advised not to fight unless attacked and to consult with Qays ibn Sa'd, the second in command. Wellhausen (d. 1918) names Abd Allah ibn Abbas as the commander of the vanguard, but this is rejected by Madelung, who suggests that the choice of Ubayd Allah indicates Hasan's peace intentions because the former had earlier surrendered Yemen to Mu'awiya I without a fight. This is the view of Ibn Shihab al-Zuhri (d. 741–742), the Umayyad-era historian who adopted the pro-Umayyad account that depicts a greedy Hasan eager to renounce his caliphate for money. This must have been the official Umayyad account, distributed to legitimise Mu'awiya I's rule in the absence of a council (shura) or election or designation (nass), suggests Jafri.

==== Mutiny ====
While the vanguard was awaiting his arrival in Maskin, Hasan faced a mutiny at his military camp near al-Mada'in. Among the five surviving accounts, Jafri prefers the one by Abu Hanifa Dinawari (d. 895), which states that Hasan was concerned about his troops' resolve by the time he reached the outskirts of al-Mada'in. He thus halted the army at Sabat and told them in a speech that he preferred peace over war because his men were reluctant to fight. According to al-Mada'ini (d. 843), Hasan also quoted Ali as saying, "Do not loathe the reign of Mu'awiya I", which Madelung finds incredible.

Taking the speech as a sign that Hasan intended to pursue peace, Kharijite sympathisers in Hasan's army looted his tent and pulled his prayer rug from under him. Alternatively, Jafri and al-Ya'qubi (d. 897–898) hold Mu'awiya I responsible for the mutiny through his network of spies, about which letters were earlier exchanged between Mu'awiya I and Hasan and Ubayd Allah. As he was being escorted away to safety, the Kharijite al-Jarrah ibn Sinan attacked and wounded Hasan while shouting, "You have become an infidel (kafir) like your father". Al-Jarrah was overpowered and killed, while Hasan, bleeding profusely, was taken for treatment to the house of Sa'd ibn Mas'ud al-Thaqafi, the governor of al-Mada'in. The news of this attack further demoralized Hasan's army and led to widespread desertions. Sa'd's nephew Mukhtar ibn Abi Ubayd (d. 687) reportedly recommended the governor to surrender Hasan to Mu'awiya I but was rejected.

==== Desertions ====
The Kufan vanguard arrived in Maskin and found Mu'awiya I, who was camped there. Through a representative, he urged them not to commence hostilities until he concluded his peace talks with Hasan. This was likely a false claim. The Kufans, however, insulted Mu'awiya I's envoy and sent him back. Mu'awiya I then sent an envoy to visit Ubayd Allah privately, telling him that Hasan had requested a truce, and then offered him a million dirhams to switch sides. Ubayd Allah accepted and deserted at night to Mu'awiya I, who fulfilled his promise to him.

The next morning, Qays ibn Sa'd took charge of Hasan's troops as the second-in-command and denounced Ubayd Allah in a sermon. Mu'awiya I now sent a contingent to force surrender, but was pushed back twice. He then offered bribes to Qays in a letter, which he refused. As the news of the mutiny against Hasan and the attempt at his life arrived, however, both sides abstained from fighting and awaited further developments. Veccia Vaglieri writes that the Iraqis were reluctant to fight and that a group deserted every day. By one account, 8,000 men out of 12,000 followed Ubayd Allah's example and joined Mu'awiya I. When Hasan learned about this, al-Ya'qubi writes that he summoned the Iraqi nobles and reproached them for their unreliability and fickle-mindedness, echoing the speeches of Ali after Siffin.

==== Treaty with Mu'awiya I ====
Mu'awiya I now sent envoys to propose that Hasan abdicate in his favor to spare Muslim blood. In return, Mu'awiya I was ready to designate Hasan as his successor, grant him safety, and offer him a large financial settlement. Hasan accepted the overture in principle and sent his representative(s) to Mu'awiya I, who sent them back to Hasan with carte blanche, inviting him to dictate whatever he wanted. Hasan wrote that he would surrender the Muslim rule to Mu'awiya I if he would comply with the Quran and sunna, that his successor would be appointed by a council (shura), that the people would remain safe, and that Hasan's supporters would receive amnesty. His letter was witnessed by two representatives, who carried it to Mu'awiya I. Hasan thus renounced the caliphate in August 661 after a seven-month reign. This year is considered by a number of the early Muslim sources as "the year of unity" and is generally regarded as the start of Mu'awiya I's caliphate.

===== Terms of the treaty =====
Veccia Vaglieri finds certain variants of the treaty impossible to reconcile. She lists several conditions in the early sources and questions their veracity, including an annual payment of one or two million dirhams to Hasan, a single payment of five million dirhams from the treasury of Kufa, annual revenues from variously named districts in Persia, succession of Hasan to Mu'awiya I or a council (shura) after Mu'awiya I, and preference for the Banu Hashim over the Banu Umayya in pensions. Another condition was that Mu'awiya I should end the ritual cursing of Ali in mosques, writes Mavani.

Jafri similarly notes that the terms are recorded differently and ambiguously by al-Tabari, Dinawari, Ibn Abd al-Barr, and Ibn al-Athir, while al-Ya'qubi and al-Masudi (d. 956) are silent about them. In particular, Jafri finds the timing of Mu'awiya I's carte blanche problematic in al-Tabari's account. Al-Tabari also mentions a single payment of five million dirhams to Hasan from the treasury of Kufa, which Jafri rejects because the treasury of Kufa was already in Hasan's possession at the time. He adds that Ali regularly emptied the treasury and distributed the funds among the public, and this is also reported by Veccia Vaglieri. Jafri then argues that the most comprehensive account is the one given by Ahmad ibn A'tham, probably taken from al-Mada'ini, who recorded the terms in two parts. The first part is the conditions proposed by Abd Allah ibn Nawfal, who negotiated on Hasan's behalf with Mu'awiya I in Maskin. (Note: 1) That the caliphate would be restored to Hasan after the death of Mu'awiya I, 2) that Hasan would receive five million dirhams annually from the state treasury, 3) that Hasan would receive the annual revenue of Darabjird, 4) that the people would be guaranteed peace with one another.) The second part is what Hasan stipulated in carte blanche. (Note: 1) That Mu'awiya I should rule according to the Book of God, the sunna of the Prophet, and the conduct of the righteous caliphs, 2) that Mu'awiya I would not appoint or nominate anyone to the caliphate after him, but the choice would be left to a shura, 3) that the people would be left in peace wherever they are in the land of God, 4) that the companions and the followers of Ali, their lives, properties, their women and their children, would be guaranteed safe conduct and peace, 5) that no harm or dangerous act, secretly or openly, would be done to Hasan, his brother, Husayn, or to anyone from the family of the Muhammad.) These two sets of conditions together encompass all the conditions scattered in the early sources.

Jafri thus concludes that Hasan's final conditions in carte blanche were that Mu'awiya I should act according to the Quran, sunna, and the conduct of the Rashidun caliphs, that the people should remain safe, and that the successor to Mu'awiya I should be appointed by a council. These conditions are echoed by Madelung, who adds that Hasan made no financial stipulations in his peace proposal and Mu'awiya I consequently made no payments to him, contrary to the "Umayyad propaganda" reflected in the account of al-Zuhri, quoted by al-Tabari. Since Ali and his house rejected the conduct of Abu Bakr and Umar in the shura after Umar in 23/644, Jafri believes that the clause about following the Rashidun caliphs was inserted by later Sunni authors. That Mu'awiya I agreed to an amnesty for the supporters of Ali indicates that the revenge for Uthman was a pretext for him to seize the caliphate, according to Jafri.

=== Abdication ===
In the surrender ceremony, Mu'awiya I demanded that Hasan publicly apologise. Hasan rose and reminded the people that he and Husayn were Muhammad's only grandsons, that the right to the caliphate was his and not Mu'awiya I's, but that he had surrendered it to avoid bloodshed. Mu'awiya I then spoke and recanted his earlier promises to Hasan and others, saying that those promises were made to shorten the war. As reported by the Mu'tasilite Ibn Abi'l-Hadid (d. 1258) and Abu al-Faraj al-Isfahani (d. 967), Mu'awiya I added that he had not fought the Iraqis so that they would practice Islam, which they were already doing, but to be their master (amir). Al-Baladhuri writes that Mu'awiya I then gave the Kufans three days to pledge allegiance or be killed. After this, the people rushed to vow allegiance to Mu'awiya I. Hasan left Kufa for Medina but soon received a request from Mu'awiya to subdue a Kharijite revolt near Kufa. He wrote back to Mu'awiya I that he had given up his claim to the caliphate for the sake of peace and compromise, not to fight on his side.

=== Retirement ===
Between his abdication in 41/661 and his death in 50/670, Hasan lived quietly in Medina and did not engage in politics. In compliance with the peace treaty, Hasan declined requests from (often small) Shia groups to lead them against Mu'awiya I. He was nevertheless considered the head of the house of Muhammad by the Banu Hashim and Ali's partisans, who had probably pinned their hopes on his succession to Mu'awiya. The Sunni al-Baladhuri in his Ansab writes that Hasan sent tax collectors to the Fasa and Darabjird provinces of Iran in accordance with the treaty, but the governor of Basra, instructed by Mu'awiya I, incited the people against Hasan, and his tax collectors were driven out of the two provinces. Madelung regards this account as fictitious because Hasan had just refused to join Mu'awiya I in fighting the Kharijites. He adds that Hasan had made no financial stipulations in his peace proposal, and Mu'awiya I consequently made no payments to him. Madelung suggests that the relations between the two men deteriorated when Mu'awiya I realised that Hasan would not actively support his regime.

== Death ==
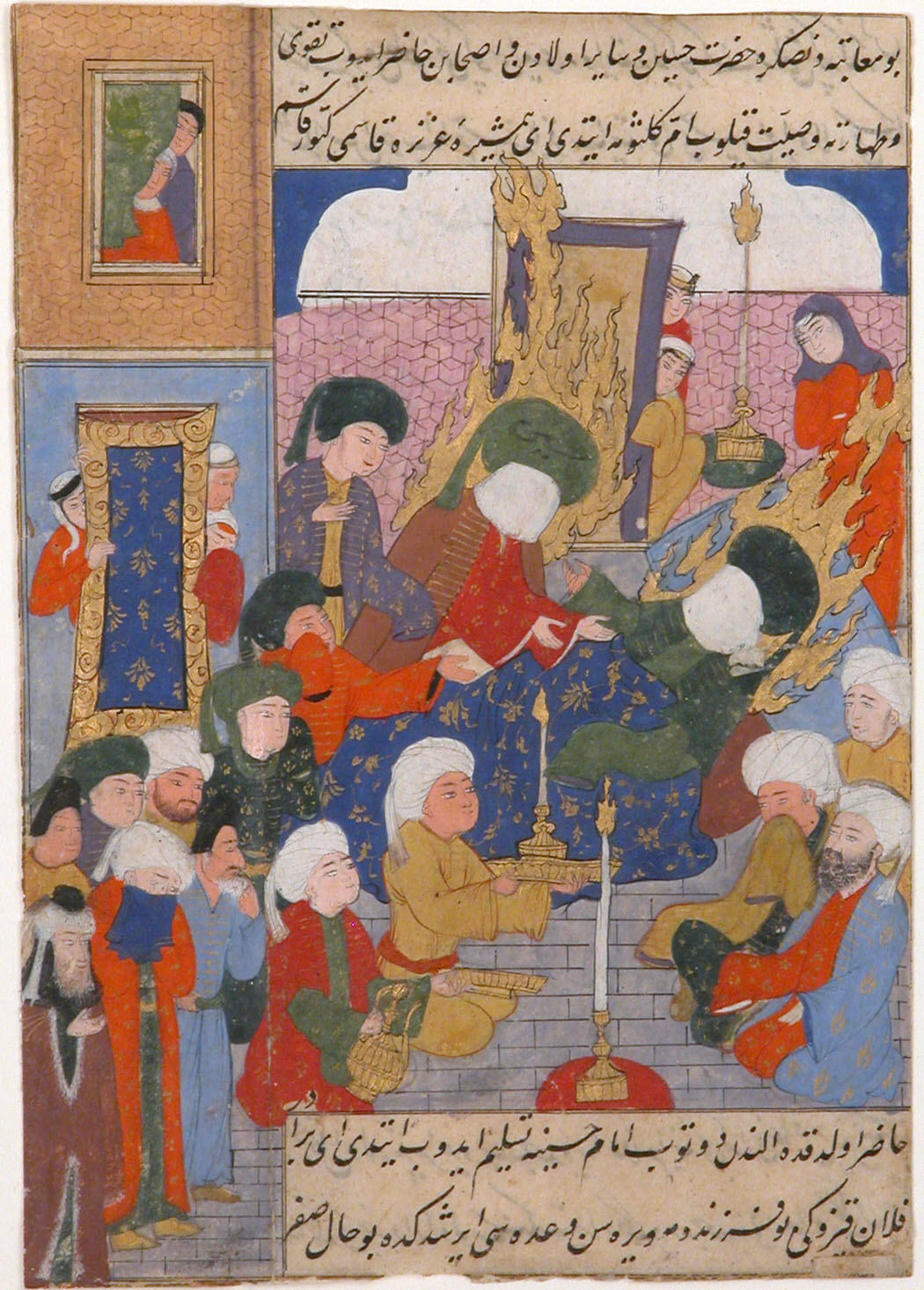
Husayn at the Bedside of the Dying Hasan, a folio from Fuzuli's Hadiqat al-su'ada (lit. 'garden of the blessed')

Hasan most likely died on 2 April 670 (5 Rabi' al-Awwal 50 AH), though other given dates are 49, 50, 48, 58 and 59 AH. Veccia Vaglieri suggests that Hasan died from an illness or poisoning, while the early sources are nearly unanimous that Hasan was poisoned.

=== Complicity of Mu'awiya I ===
Mu'awiya I is usually identified as the instigator in the murder of Hasan. Aside from the Shia sources, this is also the view of some notable Sunni historians, including al-Waqidi (d. 823), al-Mada'ini, Umar ibn Shabba (d. c. 877), al-Baladhuri, al-Haytham ibn Adi (d. 822), and Abu Bakr ibn Hafs. These reports are nevertheless suppressed by al-Tabari, perhaps because he found them insignificant or far more likely because he was concerned for the faith of the common people (awamm) in this and similar instances, as suggested by Madelung and Donaldson (d. 1976). Some other early Sunni sources deny the poisoning, saying that Hasan died of "consumption".

At the time of his abdication, Hasan was about thirty-eight years old while Mu'awiya I was fifty-eight. Jafri suggests that the age difference presented a problem for Mu'awiya I, who planned to designate his son Yazid I (r. 680–683) as his successor, in violation of the peace treaty with Hasan. Jafri thus believes that Mu'wiya should be suspected in the murder of Hasan, which removed an obstacle to the succession of his son. This view is echoed by Momen and Madelung.

=== Historical accounts ===
Hasan did not disclose who he suspected of his poisoning, fearing that the wrong person might be punished. The Shia al-Mufid (d. 1022) reports that Hasan's wife Ja'da bint al-Ash'ath poisoned him with the promise of 100,000 dirhams from Mu'awiya I and marriage to his son Yazid. Jafri writes that the majority of Sunni and Shia reports are similar to this one, including those by Abu al-Faraj al-Isfahani, al-Mas'udi (d. 956), and al-Ya'qubi. In contrast, Ahmed regards these reports as "Alid propaganda" against Al-Ash'ath, Ja'da's father and the prominent Kufan tribal chief who undermined Ali at Siffin (657) by supporting the arbitration, and sabotaged Ali's campaign after being bribed by Mu'awiya I, according to Madelung. As with Jafri, Veccia Vaglieri notes that many early sources hold Ja'da bint al-Ash'ath responsible for poisoning Hasan at the instigation of Mu'awiya I, though she also observes that al-Ash'ath was regarded as a traitor by the Shia who might have transferred the blame to his daughter.

Alternatively, the Sunni al-Haytham ibn Adi identifies the daughter of Suhayl ibn Amr as the murderer. Another account by the Sunni al-Waqidi pins the crime on a servant of Hasan at the instigation of Mu'awiya I. Yet another account is that Yazid proposed to Zaynab, the daughter of Ja'far ibn Abi Talib, who refused and instead married Hasan. The enraged Yazid subsequently had Hasan poisoned.

=== Forensics investigation ===
A 2016 forensic examination of the circumstances surrounding Hasan's death, using mineralogical, medical, and chemical evidence, determined that mercury poisoning was the main cause of his death. According to this analysis, the mercury was supplied as the mineral calomel (mercury(I) chloride, Hg_{2}Cl_{2}), sourced from the Byzantine Empire. Because historical sources indicate that another member of Hasan's household also suffered similar symptoms, the article considers Hasan's wife to be the prime suspect. The article cites a historical document, according to which the Byzantine emperor (likely Constantine IV) sent Mu'awiya I a poisoned drink at the request of the latter. The authors thus conclude that their forensic hypothesis is consistent with the historical narrative that Hasan was poisoned by his wife Ja'da at the instigation of Mu'awiya I and with the involvement of the Byzantine emperor.

=== Burial ===
Before his death, Hasan had instructed his family to bury him next to Muhammad. According to Madelung, if they "feared evil," Hasan asked them to bury him near his mother in al-Baqi cemetery. The Umayyad governor of Medina, Sa'id ibn al-As, was not opposed to burying Hasan near Muhammad, whereas Marwan ibn al-Hakam strongly opposed it, arguing that Uthman had been buried in al-Baqi. In his opposition, Marwan was joined by Muhammad's widow Aisha, who is often considered hostile to Ali.

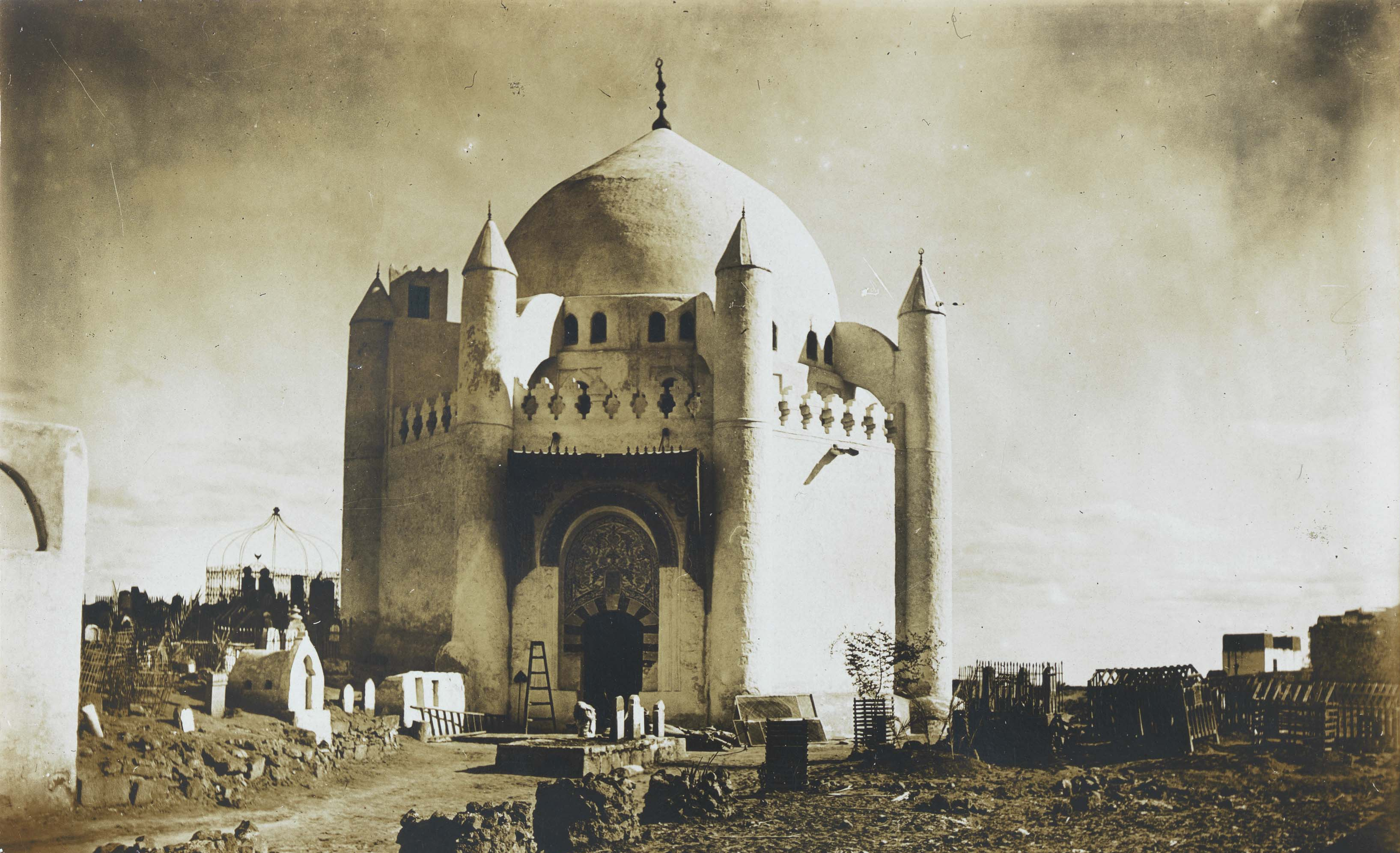
The historical tomb of al-Baqi was destroyed in 1926 during and by Wahhabi movement in Saudi Arabia

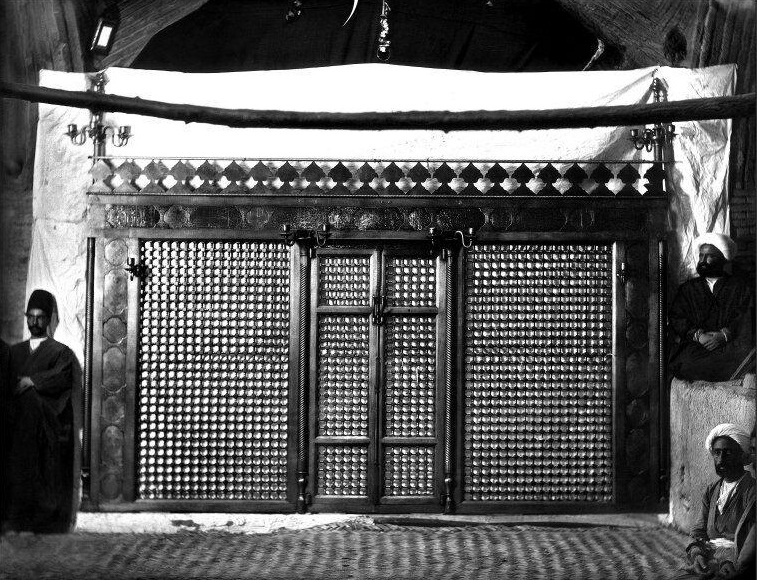
Now-destroyed zarih formerly covering the grave of his grave in the Mausoleum of Shia Imams

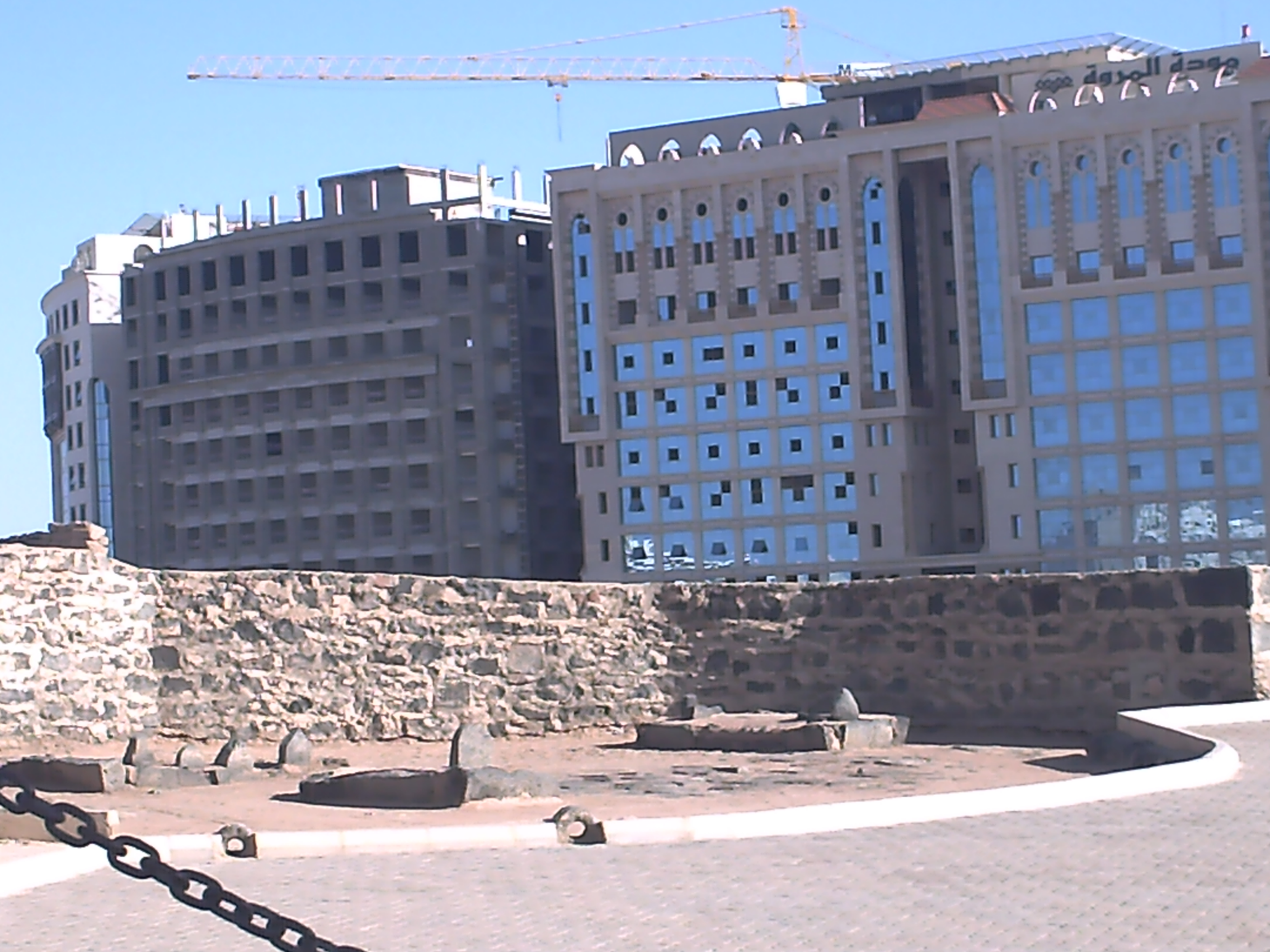
Hasan's destroyed gravesite in the al-Baqi Cemetery in the present

Muhammad's companion Abu Hurayra unsuccessfully attempted to persuade Marwan to allow Hasan's burial next to Muhammad by reminding him of Muhammad's high esteem for Hasan and Husayn. Supporters of Husayn and Marwan from the Banu Hashim and Banu Umayya, respectively, soon gathered with weapons. Muhammad ibn al-Hanafiyya reportedly intervened and reminded Hasan's burial request. He was then buried in al-Baqi. Dinawari writes the Umayyads shot arrows at the body during the standoff, and this is also the Shia view. Madelung suggests that Mu'awiya I later rewarded Marwan for his stand by reinstating him as the governor of Medina. As Hasan's body was carried to al-Baqi, however, Marwan reportedly joined the procession and paid tribute to a man "whose forbearance (hilm) weighed mountains". Following the norms, Hasan's funeral prayer was led by Sa'id ibn al-As, the governor of Medina. Hasan's tomb was later made a domed shrine, which was destroyed twice by the Wahhabis first in 1806 and then 1927. (Note: In Wahhabi belief, historical sites and shrines encourage shirk – the sin of idolatry or polytheism – and should be destroyed. See Taylor, Jerome (24 September 2011). "Mecca for the rich - Islam's holiest site "turning into Vegas"". The Independent. Archived from the original on 16 June 2017.)

== Family life ==
Sources differ about Hasan's wives and children. The account of Ibn Sa'd is considered the most reliable, reporting that Hasan had fifteen sons and nine daughters with six wives and three known concubines. His first marriage was contracted with Ja'da, daughter of the Kinda chief al-Ash'ath ibn Qays, soon after Ali relocated to Kufa. Madelung suggests that Ali with this marriage intended to establish ties with the powerful Yemeni tribes in Kufa. Hasan had no children with Ja'da, who is often accused of poisoning him. Umm Bashir was Hasan's second wife and bore him his eldest son Zayd, his daughter Umm al-Husayn, and probably another daughter Umm al-Hasan. Umm Bashir was the daughter of Abu Mas'ud Uqba ibn Amr, who had opposed the Kufan revolt against Uthman. Madelung writes that Ali was hoping to bring Abu Mas'ud to his side with the marriage.

After his abdication and return to Medina, Hasan married Khawla, daughter of the Fazara chief Manzur ibn Zabban. Khawla already had two sons and a daughter from Muhammad ibn Talha, who was killed in the Battle of the Camel. After her father protested that he had been ignored, Hasan presented Khawla to her father and remarried her with his approval. Khawla bore Hasan his son, Hasan. Hasan in Medina also married Hafsa bint Abd al-Rahman ibn Abi Bakr. It is said that al-Mundhir ibn al-Zubayr was in love with her and his rumors compelled Hasan to divorce her. The rumors also ended Hafsa's next marriage and she eventually married al-Mundhir. Hasan also married Umm Ishaq bint Talha ibn Ubayd Allah. Mu'awiya I reputedly asked her brother Ishaq ibn Talha to marry her to Yazid but Ishaq married her to Hasan instead and she bore a son named Talha. Another wife of Hasan was Hind bint Suhayl ibn Amr, the widow of Abd al-Rahman ibn Attab, who was divorced by Abd Allah ibn Amir. Hasan had no children with Hind. Hasan's other children were probably from concubines, including Qasim and Abd Allah (or Abu Bakr), both of whom were killed in the Battle of Karbala (680), and Umm Abd Allah, who married Zayn al-Abidin and bore him Muhammad al-Baqir, the fifth Shia Imam. Hasan's descendants are usually known as sharif, though the usage of the term is sometimes extended to Husayn's descendants as well.

=== Number of consorts ===
Tendentious Sunni reports describe that Hasan married seventy (or ninety) women in his lifetime and had a harem of three hundred concubines. Madelung regards these as absurd, and Pierce believes that these accusations were made by later Sunni writers who were nevertheless unable to list more than sixteen names. Madelung writes that most of the claims were by al-Mada'ini and were often vague; some had a clear defamatory intent. In particular, the ninety-wives allegation was first made by Muhammad al-Kalbi and later picked up by al-Mada'ini, who was unable to list more than eleven names, five of whom are uncertain or highly doubtful.

Veccia Vaglieri holds that the marriages of Hasan received little contemporary censure. In contrast, Lammens (d. 1937) suggests that Hasan married and divorced so frequently that he was called mitlaq (lit. 'the divorcer') and his behavior earned Ali new enemies. Madelung rejects this claim, saying that Hasan – living in his father's household – could not enter into any marriages not arranged (or approved) by Ali. In particular, the narratives in which Ali warns the Kufans not to marry their daughters to Hasan are fabricated. Madelung believes that Hasan's marriages in Ali's lifetime were intended to strengthen political alliances, as evidenced by Hasan reserving his kunya (Abu Muhammad) for his first son with his first freely-chosen wife Khawla. When Muhammad died in childhood, Hasan chose Khawla's second son Hasan as his primary heir.

=== Divorces ===
Hasan divorced his wife Hafsa out of propriety when she was accused by al-Mundhir. Hafsa's next marriage ended similarly. When she finally married al-Mundhir, Hasan visited the couple and forgave al-Mundhir for spreading those false rumors out of love for Hafsa. Hasan also returned Khawla to her father Manzur when he objected that he had been ignored and then remarried her with his approval. Hasan is also said to have divorced his wife Hind when he saw evidence of renewed love by her former husband.

For Madelung, Hasan's divorces do not indicate any inordinate sexual appetite. He also writes that Hasan comes across as noble and forbearing in dealing with his wives. Madelung cites Hasan's advice to Husayn to marry his widow Umm Ishaq after his death. When he was poisoned, Hasan also reputedly refrained from disclosing the suspect in his household to Husayn.

== Assessment and legacy ==
Hasan
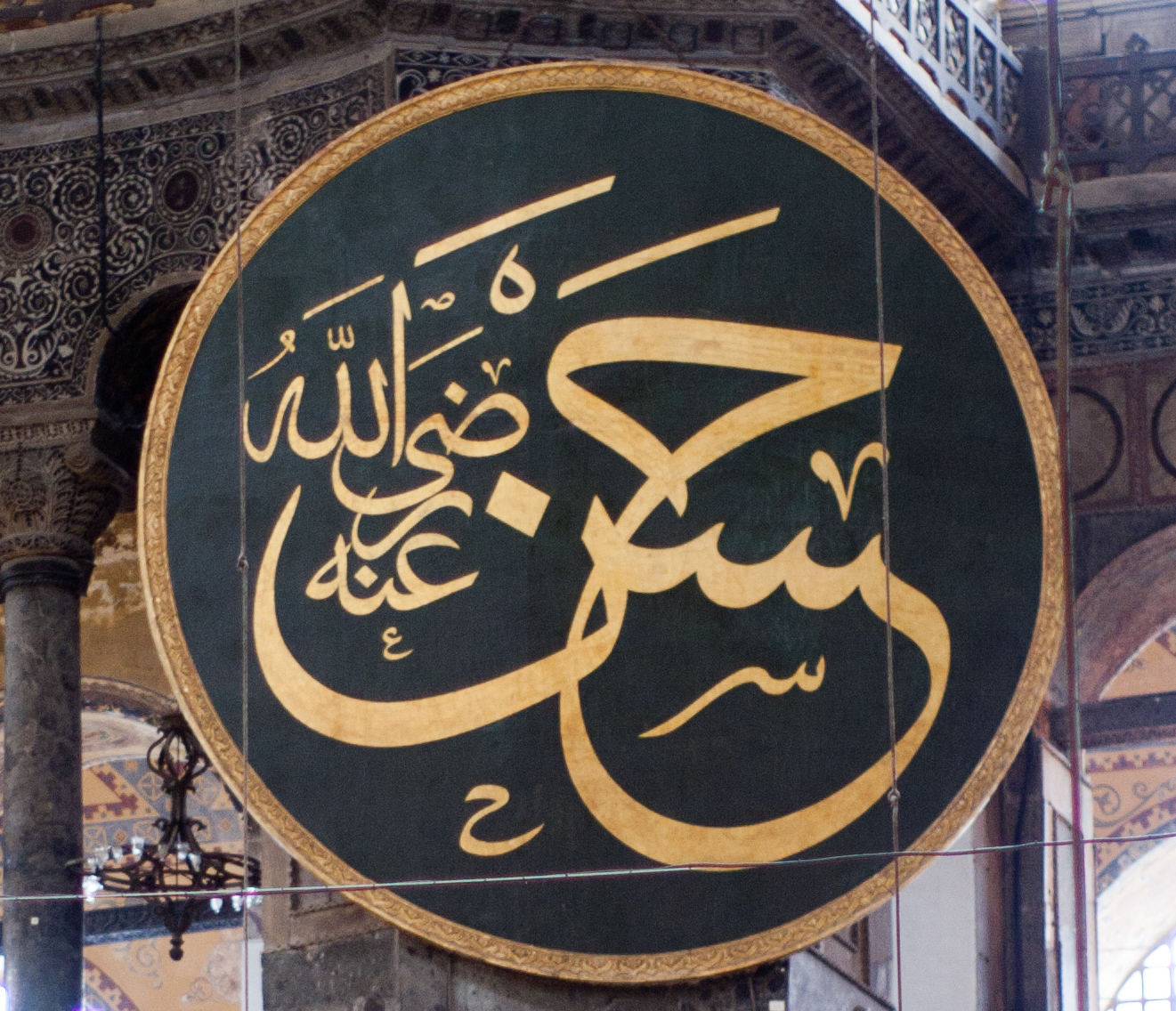
- Calligraphic seal featuring Hasan's name, on display in the Hagia Sophia

Caliph; Imam
- Venerated in: Islam; Baháʼí Faith
- Major shrine: Al-Baqi Cemetery, Medina

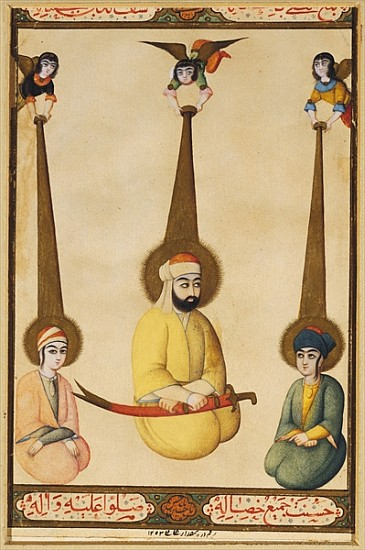
Early 19th-century Qajar Iran gouache illustration of Ali, Hasan, and Husayn, the first three Shia Imams

=== Appearance and temperament ===
Hasan has been described as closely resembling Muhammad in his appearance. Madelung suggests that Hasan might have also inherited Muhammad's temperament and describes him as a pacifist. Veccia Vaglieri writes that he was of mild disposition (halim), generous, pious, and known to have made several pilgrimages on foot. While Hasan is described as a good orator, he might have also suffered from a speech defect, according to Abu al-Faraj al-Isfahani. In contrast to Hasan, Madelung suggests that Husayn might have inherited his father's "fighting spirit".

=== Abdication ===
The sources hostile to Hasan interpret his peace treaty with Mu'awiya I as a sign of weakness, saying that Hasan intended to surrender from the beginning. Some authors instead suggest that Hasan's decision to abdicate was motivated by the lure of the life of ease and luxury, while Western historians tend to criticise Hasan for ceding the caliphate.

Other sources reject these criticisms, saying that Hasan's abdication was inevitable after the Kufans' mutiny, similar to Ali's acceptance of the arbitration proposal at Siffin (657). These sources contend that Hasan was motivated by the desire for unity and peace in the Muslim community, similar to Ali after Muhammad's death. Shia historians view Hasan's abdication as the only realistic course of action, given the Kufans' weak support and Mu'awiya I's overwhelming military superiority. Their view is echoed by Veccia Vaglieri. Sunni sources maintain that Hasan abdicated because of his preference for peace and his aversion to bloodshed and bellicose politics. The first two of these three reasons are also given by the Shia Tabatabai (d. 1981).

=== In Islam ===
Hasan is a member of the ahl al-bayt (Muhammad's family) and belongs also to the ahl al-kisa, namely, Muhammad, Ali, Fatima, and their two sons. While all Muslims revere the ahl al-bayt, it is the Shia who hold them in the highest esteem, regarding them as the rightful leaders of the Muslim community.

==== Quran ====
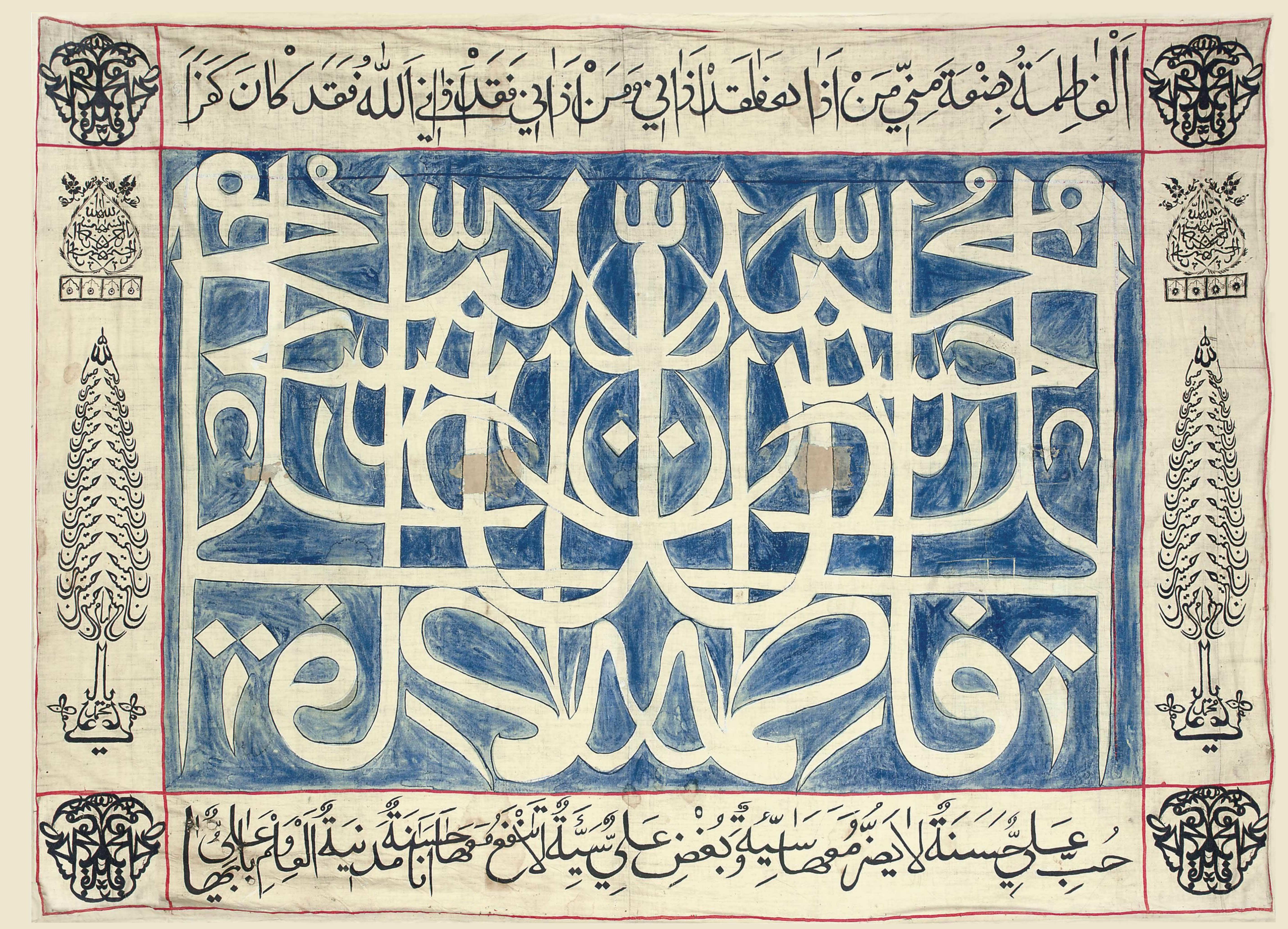
Names of the ahl al-kisa and two prophetic hadiths in their praise, written on a cloth in Arabic calligraphy, originating from Iran or Central Asia

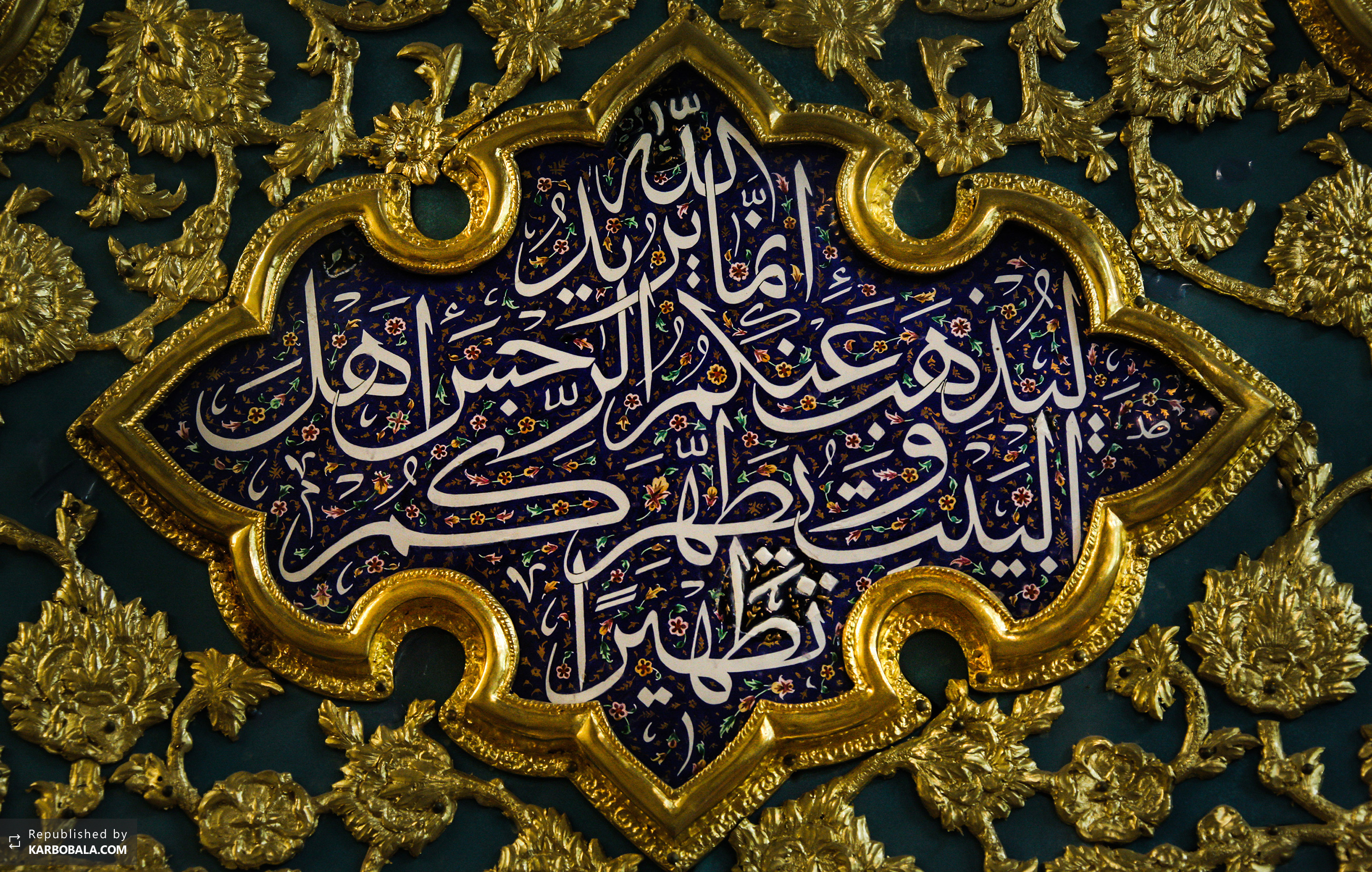
Verse of purification in Arabic calligraphy on a tablet in the shrine of Husayn in Karbala

Verse of Mubahala: After his unsuccessful debate with the Najranite Christians in 10/631–632, Muhammad is said to have received verse 3:61, which reads:

And to whomsoever disputes with thee over it, after the knowledge that has come unto thee [about Jesus], say, "Come! Let us call upon our sons and your sons, our women and your women, ourselves and yourselves. Then let us pray earnestly, so as to place the curse of God upon those who lie".

Madelung argues that "our sons" in verse 3:61 must refer to Muhammad's grandsons, namely Hasan and Husayn. Later at the mubahala, Muhammad gathered Ali, Fatima, Hasan, and Husayn under his cloak and addressed them as his ahl al-bayt, according to some Shia and Sunni sources, including the canonical Sahih Muslim and Sahih al-Tirmidhi. The five are thus known also as the ahl al-kisa (lit. 'people of the cloak'). Madelung writes that their inclusion by Muhammad in this significant ritual must have raised the religious rank of his family. A similar view is voiced by Lalani.

Verse of purification: The last passage of verse 33:33 reads:

God only desires to remove defilement from you, O ahl al-bayt, and to purify you completely.

Shia Islam limits the ahl al-bayt to Muhammad, Ali, Fatima, Hasan, and Husayn. There are various views in Sunni Islam, though a typical compromise is to include also Muhammad's wives in the ahl al-bayt. Verse 33:33 is regarded in Shia Islam as evidence of the infallibility of the ahl al-bayt.

Verse of Mawadda: Verse 42:23 includes the passage

[O Mohammad!] Say, "I ask not of you any reward for it, save affection among kinsfolk".

The word kinsfolk (al-qurba) in this verse is interpreted by the Shia as the ahl al-bayt, namely, Ali, Fatima, Hasan, and Husayn. Ibn Ishaq (d. 767) narrates a prophetic hadith to this effect, and this is also the view of the Sunni Baydawi, al-Razi, and Ibn Maghazili, though most Sunni authors reject the Shia view and offer various alternatives. Hasan referred to verse 42:24 in his inaugural speech as the caliph in 661, saying that he belonged to the ahl al-bayt whose love God has made obligatory in the Quran.

Verses 76:5-22: These verses are connected to the ahl al-kisa in most Shia and some Sunni sources, including the works of the Shia al-Tabarsi (d. 1153), and the Sunni al-Qurtubi (d. 1273) and al-Alusi (d. 1854). According to these exegetes, verses 76:5-22 were revealed after Ali, Fatima, Hasan, and Husayn gave away their only meal of the day to beggars who visited their home for three consecutive days. In particular, verses 76:7-12 read:

They fulfill their vows and fear a day whose evil is widespread, and give food, despite loving it, to the indigent, the orphan, and the captive. "We feed you only for the Face of God. We do not desire any recompense or thanks from you. Truly we fear from our Lord a grim, calamitous day". So God has shielded them from the evil of that Day, bestowed upon them radiance and joy, and rewarded them for having been patient with a Garden and with silk.

==== In Mu'tazilism ====
In Mu'tazila Islam, only a wrong deed by an unrepentant imam would disqualify him from the imamate after receiving oaths of allegiance. Otherwise, an imam cannot resign or willingly pledge his allegiance to another person. The Mu'tazilite al-Qadi Abd al-Jabbar (d. 1025) suggests that Hasan reluctantly made peace and unwillingly pledged his allegiance to Mu'awiya I after realising the Kufans' weak support for war. This reluctant pledge of allegiance did not disqualify him from the imamate or legitimise Mu'awiya I's caliphate. The Mu'tazilite Ibn al-Malahimi (d. 1141) adds, "How can it be imagined that Hasan, who planned to fight Mu'awiya I to secure his oath of allegiance, would agree to relinquish the caliphate without reluctance?"

==== In Sunni Islam ====
During the eighth and ninth centuries, there was a diversity of opinions about which caliphs were rāshidūn ("rightly-guided"), meaning those whose actions and opinions were considered worthy of emulation from a religious point of view. After the ninth century, however, the first four caliphs became canonical as rāshid in Sunni Islam: Abu Bakr (r. 632–634), Umar (r. 634–644), Uthman (r. 644–656) and Ali (r. 656–661). The Umayyad caliph Umar ibn Abd al-Aziz (r. 717–720) was cited as a fifth rāshid caliph by the Sunni hadith collector Abu Dawud al-Sijistani (d. 889). Another hypothesis may have included Hasan as a fifth rāshid caliph, because his six-month reign was needed to complete a thirty-year period after Abu Bakr's ascension, which was predicted by Muhammad in a Sunni hadith as the length of the prophetic succession. This is also implied by Abu Dawud al-Tayalisi's version of this hadith, which avoided counting Hasan as the fifth rāshid caliph by adding six months to Umar's caliphate. The Islamist religious scholar and historian Ali al-Sallabi regards Hasan as a rāshid caliph, citing the fact that some Sunni scholars such as Ibn Kathir (c. 1300–1373) and Ibn Hajar al-Haytami (1503–1566) also held this view.

Sunni Muslims justify Hasan's peace treaty with Mu'awiya I with a hadith attributed to Muhammad, which reportedly predicted that Hasan would unite two warring Muslim parties. By legitimising Mu'awiya I's caliphate, they view the peace treaty as a voluntary resignation from the caliphate. More generally, an imam in Sunni Islam cannot be ousted or resign if he is aware of the divisiveness of his decision but he can abdicate if he considers his resignation to be in the best interest of Muslims. Hasan's abdication was a voluntary decision to avoid bloodshed.

==== In Shia Islam ====
Hasan al-Mujtaba (lit. 'the chosen') is regarded by the Shia as their second imam. Even though his abdication was criticised by some contemporary followers, he continued to be regarded until his death in 670 as the leader (imam) of the supporters of Ali. Developed by the later Shia Imams, the Shia doctrine of Imamate explains that Muhammad was succeeded by Ali and then by Hasan through divine decrees. As the rightful successor of Muhammad in Shia Islam, Hasan's all-inclusive temporal and religious authority thus came from divinely-inspired designation (nass), which could not be annulled by abdication to Mu'awiya I, who usurped only the temporal authority. Indeed, the imamate and caliphate are viewed as separate institutions in Shia Islam until such time that God would make the Imam victorious. A prophetic hadith in some Shia and Sunni sources states that Hasan and Husayn were imams "whether they stand up or sit down" (ascend to the caliphate or not).

As for the abdication, Shia theologians cite the disintegration of Hasan's corps, abandonment by his allies, the looting of his military campground, and his assassination attempt to justify Hasan's peace with Mu'awiya I. Alternatively, Veccia Vaglieri suggests that the Shia views Hasan's abdication in light of his pious detachment. Hasan's infallibility (isma) in Shia Islam further vindicates his course of action. The Shia Sharif al-Murtaza (d. 1044) writes that Hasan reluctantly made peace to end the civil war, and his subsequent pledge to Mu'awiya I is viewed by the Shia as an act of taqiya. Shia theologians perceive the treaty as a ceasefire (muh'adana) or agreement (mu'ahada) rather than an alliance with Mu'awiya I. To support this claim, they cite Mu'awiya I's violation of the treaty, the stipulation therein that Mu'awiya I should not be called amir al-mu'minin (lit. 'the commander of the faithful'), and Hasan's refusal to fight the Kharijites for Mu'awiya I.

==== Miracles ====
According to Donaldson, fewer miracles are attributed to Hasan than to other Shia Imams. Veccia Vaglieri disagrees, listing the following: Hasan recited the Quran when he was born and praised God. Later in life, he resurrected a dead man and a dead palm tree bore fruits at his request. God sent down a meal for his companions from the skies.

== Literature and TV ==
=== Literature ===
Persian literature about Hasan can be divided into two categories: historical and mystical. Historical literature includes Hasan's life, imamate, his peace with Mu'awiya, and his death. Mystical literature showcases his virtues and his prominent position in Shia spirituality.

Hasan's life has been the subject of poetry from Sanai (d. 1141) to the present. The themes are his virtues, Muhammad's admiration of him, and his suffering and death. Poets include Sanai (Hadiqat al Haqiqa), Attar of Nishapur, Ghavami Razi, Rumi, 'Ala' al-Dawla Simnani, Ibn Yamin, Khwaju Kermani, Salman Savoji, Hazin Lahiji, Naziri Neyshabouri, Vesal Shirazi, and Adib al-Malak Farahani.

=== Television ===
The series Loneliest Leader, directed in 1996 by Mehdi Fakhimzadeh, narrates Hasan's life, his peace with Mu'awiya I, and the condition of the Islamic community after his assassination. The events leading up to Hasan's peace and his attempted assassination in al-Mada'in are also mentioned in the series Mokhtarnameh by Davood Mirbagheri. Muawiya I, Hasan and Husayn is an Arab series about Hasan and Husayn which has been criticized as anti-Shia.

== See also ==
- The Fourteen Infallibles

== Notes ==
Hasan ibn Ali of the ahl al-bayt Banu Hashim Clan of the Quraysh Born: c. 625 Died: 2 April 670
Shia Islam titles
Preceded by Ali ibn Abi Talib	Imam of the Shia; 661–670	Succeeded by Husayn ibn Ali
Sunni Islam titles
Preceded by Ali ibn Abi Talib	Caliph of Islam; January 661 – August 661	Succeeded by Mu'awiya I
