= Fatima bint Hasan =

Daughter of Hasan ibn Ali

Fatima bint al-Hasan فاطمة بنت الحسن
- Born: 7th century Medina
- Died: Medina
- Other name: Umm ʿAbd Allāh
- Spouse: Ali al-Sajjad
- Children: Muhammad al-Baqir; Abd Allah; Hasan; Husayn al-Akbar
- Parents: Hasan ibn Ali (father); Umm Ishaq bint Talha (mother)
- Relatives: Al-Husayn (uncle); Hasan (brother); Zayd (brother); Hasan ibn Zayd (nephew); Qasim (brother); Talha (brother); Abd Allah (brother); Abu Bakr (brother); Bishr (brother)
- Family: Family of Ali

Fāṭima bint al-Ḥasan ibn ʿAlī (Arabic: فاطمة بنت الحسن بن علي), fl. 7th century, was a daughter of Hasan ibn Ali and Umm Ishaq bint Talha. She was married to Ali al-Sajjad (the fourth Shi'ite Imam), and became the mother of Muhammad al-Baqir (the fifth Twelver Imam). Her kunya was Umm ʿAbd Allāh and she was referred to as al-Ṣiddīqa ("the very truthful one") by her husband Ali. It has also been reported that her features were such, that no one in the family of Hasan ibn Ali looked like her.
