= Abu Bakr ibn Hasan ibn Ali =

Son of Hasan ibn Ali, killed in the Battle of Karbala

Personal life
- Born: 647 Medina
- Died: 10th of Muharram, 61 A.H. / 10 October, 680 AD
- Cause of death: Martyred in the Battle of Karbala
- Resting place: Imam Husayn Shrine, Karbala, Iraq
- Parent: Hasan ibn Ali (father)
- Known for: Being a companion of Husayn ibn Ali
- Relatives: Hasan al-Mu'thannā (brother); Zayd ibn Hasan ibn Ali (brother); Hasan ibn Zayd ibn Hasan (nephew); Qasim ibn Hasan (brother); Abdullah ibn Hasan (brother); Talha ibn Hasan (brother); Bishr ibn Hasan (brother); Fatimah bint Hasan (sister)

Religious life
- Religion: Islam

Abū Bakr ibn al-Ḥasan ibn ʿAlī (Arabic: أبو بكر بن الحسن بن علي; 647 - 680) was the son of Hasan ibn Ali. He went to Karbala with his uncle Husayn ibn Ali, and was killed in the Battle of Karbala on the day of Ashura.

== Lineage ==
Abu Bakr was a son of Hasan ibn Ali. Some believe that he and his brother Qasim were both sons of Ramla.

== On the day of Ashura ==
Abu al-Faraj considers Abu Bakr's martyrdom to have occurred before that of Qasim. Abu al-Faraj quotes from Al-Mada'ini, who through his chain of transmitters quotes from Abu Mikhnaf, and from Sulayman bin Rashid that Abu Bakr was martyred by an arrow shot fired by Abd Allah ibn Uqba al-Ghanawi. But Al-Tabari, Ibn Athir, Shaykh Mufid and others relate his martyrdom as occurring after that of Qasim.

Abu Bakr's name is mentioned in Ziyarat al-Nahiya al-Muqaddasa and Ziyarat Rajabiyya and his murderer has been cursed.
