= Abd Allah ibn Hasan ibn Ali =

Son of Hasan ibn Ali, killed in the Battle of Karbala

Abd Allah ibn al-Hasan ibn Ali عبد الله بن الحسن بن علي
- Born: 669 AD; Medina
- Died: 10 October, 680 AD; Karbala
- Burial place: Imam Husayn Shrine, Karbala, Iraq
- Parents: Hasan ibn Ali (father); Zaynab bint Subay' (mother)
- Relatives: Hasan al-Mu'thannā (brother); Zayd ibn Hasan ibn Ali (brother); Hasan ibn Zayd ibn Hasan (nephew); Qasim ibn Hasan (brother); Talha ibn Hasan (brother); Bishr ibn Hasan (brother); Abu Bakr ibn Hasan (brother); Fatimah bint Hasan (sister)

ʿAbd Allāh ibn al-Ḥasan ibn ʿAlī (Arabic: عبد الله بن الحسن بن علي) was the son of Hasan ibn Ali and Zaynab(Umm Abdullah) bint Subay' who was the daughter of Subay' bin Abdullah and the niece of Jarir Al-Bajali. He went to Karbala with his uncle Husayn ibn Ali, and was killed at the Battle of Karbala. His name was mentioned in Ziyarat al-Nahiya al-Muqaddasa.

According to Shia Muslims, Abd Allah ibn al-Hasan was 11 years old when he was killed in the Battle of Karbala. During the last moments of Husayn ibn Ali's life, Bahr ibn Ka’ab was about to strike him when Abd Allah came running out of the tents. He stood in his way and shouted "O, son of the corrupt woman! Are you going to strike my uncle?". Abd Allah shielded Husayn from the stroke of the sword, whereby his hand got cut and began to dangle. Abd Allah cried "O, uncle". Husayn took hold of his nephew, drew him to his chest and said "O, son of my brother! Bear patiently what you have suffered, and consider it good, because Allah will make you meet your pious forefathers." At that point Harmala ibn Kahil threw an arrow at Abd Allah, and killed him in his uncle's arms.
