= Bishr ibn Hasan =

Son of Hasan ibn Ali (died 680 AD)

- Born: Medina
- Died: 10 October, 680 AD; Karbala
- Father: Hasan ibn Ali
- Relatives: Hasan al-Mu'thannā(brother); Zayd ibn Hasan ibn Ali (brother); Hasan ibn Zayd ibn Hasan (nephew); Qasim ibn Hasan (brother); Abdullah ibn Hasan (brother); Talha ibn Hasan (brother); Abu Bakr ibn Hasan (brother); Fatimah bint Hasan (sister)
- Family: Family of Ali

Bishr ibn al-Ḥasan (Arabic: بشر بن الحسن) was a great-grandson of the Islamic prophet Muhammad. He was the son of second Shia Imam Hasan ibn Ali. He is considered to be one of the martyrs of the Battle of Karbala, although no record describes the circumstances surrounding his death by enemy forces.

The first mention of Bishr ibn al-Hasan being killed at Karbala was by Shia scholar Ibn Shahrashub. Of Hasan ibn Ali's twenty sons, seven participated in the battle, among them Bishr ibn al-Hasan. All but one brother was killed during the battle. In his account of their deaths, Shahrashub writes on Bishr: "... and it has been said that Bishr has been martyred, too."

Among Bishr ibn al-Hasan's brothers who were present at the event of Ashura were Amr (who was killed in the event at Karbala when he was a child), Hasan (better known as 'Hasan al-Muthanna'), Qasim (who was also considered to be killed at Karbala), Abd Allah (Abd Allah al-Asghar).

== See also ==
- List of casualties in Husayn's army at the Battle of Karbala
- Husayn ibn Ali
- Battle of Karbala
- Sayyid
- Arba'een Pilgrimage
- Banu Hashim
