= Talha ibn Hasan =

Son of Hasan ibn Ali

Talha ibn al-Hasan طلحة بن الحسن
- Born: Medina
- Parents: Hasan ibn Ali (father); Umm Ishaq bint Talha (mother)
- Relatives: Hasan al-Mu'thannā(brother); Zayd ibn Hasan ibn Ali (brother); Hasan ibn Zayd ibn Hasan (nephew); Qasim ibn Hasan (brother); Abdullah ibn Hasan (brother); Bishr ibn Hasan (brother); Abu Bakr ibn Hasan (brother); Fatimah bint Hasan (sister)

Ṭalḥa ibn al-Ḥasan (Arabic: طلحة بن الحسن) was a son of Umm Ishaq and Hasan ibn Ali. He was a grandson of the fourth caliph Ali ibn Abi Talib on his father's side and of Talha ibn Ubayd Allah on his mother's side.

== His family ==
His mother, Umm Ishaq, the daughter of Talha ibn Ubayd Allah, was described as extremely beautiful. Mu'awiya proposed her marriage to his son, Yazid, when he met her brother, Ishaq ibn Talha, in Damascus, however Ishaq, returning to Medina, gave her to al-Hasan, which made Mu'awiya to give her up. Hasan asked his younger brother Husayn, to marry her after his death. She bore Hasan ibn Ali his son Talha, who later died childless.

== See also ==
- Talhah (name)
- Hasan (name)
