= R. Erdem Erkul =

R. Erdem Erkul is a Turkish tech entrepreneur who is the founder and chairman of Cerebrum Tech. Erkul is known for his work on e-government, mobile government, New Public Management, Web 3.0, e-participation, public policy, entrepreneurship, and artificial intelligence.

He has worked at Samsung Electronics Türkiye as Director of Public Sector and External Affairs between 2014 and 2018. He was also the spokesperson of Samsung Electronics Türkiye during these years. He is chairperson of the Foreign Economic Relations Board (DEIK) Digital Technologies Business Council and DEIK Sectoral Business Council Coordinator Chairperson. Erkul is a member of the DEIK Board of Directors. Erkul was appointed as the Honorary Consul of the Republic of Korea in Sivas by May 2024.

== Career ==
In 2005, he established first web portal on e-government and informatics of the world. He is editor of this portal. He has worked as the coordinator in the Total Quality and Strategic Planning activities of the Hacettepe University in 2005–2006. In 2008, he established a new international e-government portal digital-government.net. He was Chair of Organizing Committee of GovCamp Türkiye in 2011.

He worked as Director of Public Sector and Investment at Microsoft Türkiye between 2010 and 2013. Erkul has worked as Regional National Plan Director at Microsoft Middle East & Africa Headquarters in 2013–2014.

In addition, Erkul had worked as a director and company spokesperson at Samsung between 2014 and 2018. Moreover, in these years, he had taken part in different R&D and innovation projects and tasks between South Korea and Turkey. Erkul had an important role in establishing innovation and R&D centers in Turkey and MEA. Under his leadership Samsung Supports UN World Humanitarian Summit with Virtual Reality Hub.

Erkul has worked with several NGOs. He served as the Vice President of the Brussels-based Council of European Professional Informatics Societies between 2014 and 2017.

Erkul is executive committee member of Turkish Informatics Foundation and Global Girişimcilik Network (GEN Türkiye - Global Entrepreneurship Network). Between 2011 and 2015, he worked as Vice President of International Relations and Executive Board Member at the Informatics Association of Türkiye.

Erkul also serves as the chairperson of the Foreign Economic Relations Board (DEIK) Digital Technologies Business Council and he is DEIK Sectoral Business Council Coordinator Chairperson. In addition, he is a member of the DEIK Board of Directors and executive committee.

Since August 2023, Erkul has been a member of the Forbes Technology Council, a global community bringing together distinguished technology leaders and executives.

As of 2026, Erkul serves as an independent board member at Yataş Group and a board member at Yıldız Holding.

== Selected works ==
- Book Chapter. Use of Social Media in Government, 2012. Editor: Mete Yildiz
- Usability of Social Media in Public Services and Politics
- Aydin, M. D., Yildiz, M. and Erkul, E. (2012), "CCTV Surveillance and Ethics: Theory and Practice in the West and The MOBESE Case of Turkey", in Robinson, S. and Arslan, M. (eds.), Business Ethics: Contemporary Global and Regional Issues, Saarbrücken: Lambert Academic Publishing, pp. 55–76.
- Web 2.0 in the Process of e-participation: the Case of Organizing for America and the Obama Administration. NCDG Working paper #09-001. 2009, with Aysu Kes ERKUL.
