= Al-Haytham ibn 'Adi =

Abbasid Kufan linguist and historian

- الهيثم بن عدي
- Born: 734 AD
- Died: 822 AD; Baghdad, Abbasid Caliphate
- Occupations: Historian, Scholar
- Known for: Islamic historiography, classification of akhbar
- Notable work: Tabaqat man rawa 'an al-Nabi, Kitab Tarikh al-Ashraf

Al-Haytham ibn 'Adi (734 - 822) was an Islamic historian and scholar, recognized for his systematic organization of historical narratives (akhbar). His methodologies and classifications had a significant impact on the field of Islamic historiography, influencing later historians such as al-Tabari and al-Baladhuri. Despite some critiques regarding his use of isnād (chains of transmission), his works, including "Tabaqat man rawa 'an al-Nabi" and "Kitab Tarikh al-Ashraf," remain important references in historical studies. Al-Haytham's contributions to documenting Islamic history have been widely acknowledged in academic circles.

== Early life and education ==
Al-Haytham ibn 'Adi, born around 734 AD, was a notable Islamic historian and scholar. He is recognized for his contributions to the organization and narration of historical accounts (akhbar) and his profound impact on Islamic historiography.

== Historical contributions ==
Al-Haytham ibn 'Adi is best known for his critical role in structuring akhbar according to an organized system, which marked a significant advancement in the historiographical methodology of his time. He was among the first to classify historical narratives systematically, setting a precedent for future historians.

He was also known for authoring significant works on the classes of jurists and hadith transmitters, notably "Tabaqat man rawa 'an al-Nabi" which categorized transmitters from the Prophet. Despite criticisms regarding his occasional inaccuracy and loose use of isnād (chains of transmission), his works are vital references in historical studies.

== Notable works ==
- Tabaqat man rawa 'an al-Nabi: This work classified transmitters of hadiths and jurists, offering a comprehensive overview of key figures in Islamic jurisprudence and hadith scholarship.
- Kitab Tarikh al-Ashraf: Another significant historical text attributed to him, providing detailed accounts of notable historical figures and events.

== Influence and legacy ==
Al-Haytham ibn 'Adi's methodologies and classifications influenced prominent historians like al-Tabari and al-Baladhuri, whose works often referenced his narratives. His contributions significantly shaped the historical landscape of the Islamic world and provided a structured approach to documenting history.

His unique style, combining historical narratives with systematic organization, earned him recognition as a pioneer in Islamic historiography, despite some critiques of his methods.

== Death ==
Al-Haytham ibn 'Adi died in 822 AD.
