= Al-Qasim ibn Hasan ibn Ali =

Son of Hasan ibn Ali (667–680)

Al-Qasim ibn Hasan ibn Ali القاسم ابن الحسن ابن علي

Personal life
- Born: Sha'ban 7, 47 AH / October 4, 667 CE Medina, Umayyad Caliphate (now Saudi Arabia)
- Died: Muharram 10, 61 AH / October 10, 680 CE (aged 13) Karbala, Umayyad Caliphate (now Iraq)
- Resting place: Imam Husayn Shrine
- Parents: Hasan ibn Ali (father); Umm Farwa (mother)
- Relatives: Hasan al-Mu'thannā (brother); Zayd ibn Hasan ibn Ali (brother); Hasan ibn Zayd ibn Hasan (nephew); Abdullah ibn Hasan (brother); Bishr ibn Hasan (brother); Abu Bakr ibn Hasan (brother); Talha ibn Hasan (brother); Fatimah bint Hasan (sister)

Al-Qasim ibn al-Hasan (Arabic: القاسم بن الحسن) (Sha'ban 7, 47 AH / October 4, 667 CE in Medina – Muharram 10, 61 AH / October 10, 680 CE in Karbala) was the son of Hasan. He supported his uncle Husayn in fighting off the Umayyad forces during the Battle of Karbala, where he was killed at the age of 13. Qasim is buried in the mausoleum of the collective grave of the martyrs of Karbala in the Imam Husayn Shrine, a profoundly holy site in Shia Islam.

== Early life ==
Qasim was born the son of Hasan ibn Ali, the second Imam, and his wife Umm Farwa. His father was the elder son of Ali ibn Abi Talib and Fatima. Qasim was thus a great-grandson of the Islamic prophet Muhammad, who was the father of Fatima.

=== Death of Hasan ibn Ali ===
Hasan ibn Ali, Qasim's father died on the 28th Safar 50 AH (2 April 670 CE) allegedly due to poisoning.

Qasim was only three years old when his father died. However he grew up in the company of his paternal family. Like his cousins, Awn and Muhammad, the sons of his paternal aunt Zaynab bint Ali, Qasim was taught fencing by his uncle Abbas ibn Ali and cousin Ali al-Akbar ibn Husayn. When Hasan's brother Husayn ibn Ali prepared to leave Medina in 680, Qasim's mother Umm Farwa asked Husayn to take her and the young Qasim with him.

== Battle of Karbala ==
Prior to his death, the Umayyad ruler Mu'awiya I appointed his son, Yazid I as his successor. Yazid tried to desire religious authority by obtaining the allegiance of Husayn ibn Ali, but Husayn would not give up his principles. After the people of Kufa sent letters to Husayn and asking his help and pledging their allegiance to him, Husayn and his family members (including Qasim) and his companions traveled from Mecca to Kufa in Iraq but were forced to camp in the plains of Karbala by Yazid's army of 30,000 men. Husayn and most of his family and companions, including Qasim ibn Hasan, were killed and then beheaded in the Battle of Karbala on 10 October 680 (10 Muharram 61 AH) by Yazid, and the women and children were taken as prisoners.

=== Battle ===
Qasim asked his uncle, "Will I also be among the martyrs?" Husayn ibn Ali replied: "How do you see death?" Qasim said, "O uncle, death to me is sweeter than honey."

=== Ashura ===
On the day of Ashura, Qasim, like other cousins before him, went to his uncle to ask for permission. Husayn would not permit him to fight because he was too young and Husayn could not bear the thought of anything happening to him. Qasim asked many times before going to his mother. When his mother saw that her son was upset, she gave him a letter that Qasim's father had written before he died. The letter stated:

My son Qasim, a day will come when my brother Husayn will be facing an enemy army of tens of thousands. That will be the day when Islam will need to be saved by sacrifice. You must represent me on that day.

Qasim read the letter and gave to his uncle. After reading the letter Husayn said,

O my brother's son, how can I stop you from doing what your father wanted you to do? In the Name of Allah, go! Allah be with you!"

He went to the battlefield and killed many fighters. A man came from behind and struck Qasim on the head. He fell to the ground, bleeding heavily. He called out for his uncle. Husayn and Abbas rushed over. The army of Yazid got scared thinking they were coming to attack them, creating confusion. Horses began running from one side to another, trampling and killing Qasim. Husayn and Abbas called out for him, but no reply came. When they found his body Husayn as took off his abaa and with Abbas collected his remains.

== Burial ==
On 10 October 680 (Muharram 10, 61 AH), the day of Ashura, Qasim ibn Hasan was killed near the Euphrates, where Husayn and his followers were not allowed to get water. All the 72 companions of Husayn, including Qasim ibn Hasan were buried in a mass grave. The mass grave is located at the foot of Husayn's grave.

== Impact ==
Not only did Husayn's suffering and death become a symbol of sacrifice in the struggle for right against wrong, and for justice and truth against injustice and deception in the Islamic world, especially the Shia view, but his stand also became a symbol of resistance, inspiring future uprisings against oppressors and injustice. Throughout history, many notable personalities, such as Nelson Mandela and Mahatma Gandhi, have cited Husayn's stand against oppression as an example for their own fights against injustice. The death of Husayn and his companions at Karbala is believed by both Shias and the Sunnis to be a sacrifice made to prevent the corruption of Islam by tyrannical rulers and to protect its ideology.

== See also ==
- List of casualties in Husayn's army at the Battle of Karbala
- Sakinah bint Husayn
