= Abu Talha =

Abu Talha may refer to:

- Abu Talha, a village in northern Syria
- Abu Talhah al Amrikee, or Zachary Adam Chesser (born 2001), Bangladeshi-American man convicted of aiding a terrorist organisation
- Abu Talha al-Ansari, companion of Muhammad and one of the Anṣār of Medina
- Abu Talha Al-Almani or Denis Cuspert, also known as Deso Dogg (1975–2018), German former rapper and ISIL member
- Abu Talha (politician) (born 1939), Bangladeshi politician
