= Talha Ahmet Erdem =

Turkish judoka

Talha Ahmet Erdem is a Turkish world champion judoka with Down syndrome. He competes in the 81 kg division of T23 disability category.
