= Ziyarat al-Nahiya al-Muqaddasa =

Related Ziyarat to Hussain ibn Ali

Ziyarat al-Nahiya al-Muqaddasa (Arabic: زِيَارَة ٱلنَّاحِيَة ٱلْمُقَدَّسَة) which means Ziyarat of the sacred area, is regarded as a related Ziyarat to Hussain ibn Ali; it is recited on Ashura day (and likewise other times).

There are two Ziyarats that are well known by that title, the first one is considered as the famous one and the second one which is Ziyarat al Shuhada and it contains the name of Hussein's companions with the ones who killed them.

The beginning of the famous Ziyarat is about salutation to divine prophets and likewise Ma'sum (infallible) Imams; it keeps on by greeting to Imam Hussain and also his companions. Afterward, it mentions some traits/virtues of him; his uprising background, his martyrdom and passions circumstances, the grief of all the universe, beings of heaven/earth, due to his sensations. Eventually, it is ended with tawassul (having recourse) to Ma'sum Imams and likewise du'a (supplication) to Allah.

== Etymology ==
Generally, ziyārah (Arabic: زیارة) means "visiting" and likewise "going to sacred places"; from Islamic view, it means turning and withdrawing from something; this is regarded as going/visiting holy shrine of saint persons such as the Islamic Prophet Muhammad, Ali, Hussain and even visiting Imamzadeh and famous religious figures. On the other hand, the phrase "Nahiya Muqaddsah literally means sacred zone"; additionally, Nahiya Muqqadasa is an expression that Shia Muslims were using it to mention the infallible Imam since the time of (Imam) Hadi to the end of minor occultation.

== Verses of the Ziyarat ==
Some initial phases of Ziyarat Nahiya Muqaddasa are as follows:

- In the name of God,
- Peace be upon Adam, the chosen one of God from among His creation.
- Peace be upon Seth (Shaith), the Saint of God and His elite.
- Peace be upon Enoch (Idris), who established religion on behalf of God by His authority.
- Peace be upon Noah, whose invocation for punishment was answered.
- Peace be upon Hud, who was assisted through God's aid.
- Peace be upon Salih, whom God crowned with His generosity.
- Peace be upon Abraham, whom God endowed with His friendship.
- Peace be upon Ishmael, whom God ransomed with a great sacrifice from His Heaven.
- Peace be upon Isaac, in whose progeny God placed prophethood.
- Peace be upon Israel(Jacob), for whom God restored his sight by His mercy.
- Peace be upon Joseph, whom God rescued from the well by His majesty.
- Peace be upon Moses, the one for whom God split the sea with His Power.
- Peace be upon Aaron, whom God distinguished with his prophethood.
- Peace be upon Jethro (Reuel or Shu’aib), whom God made victorious over his people.
- Peace be upon David, to whom God turned in mercy.
- Peace be upon Solomon, for whom God made the Ghosts subservient by His majesty.
- Peace be upon Job (Ayyub), whom God cured after his prolonged illness.
- Peace be upon Jonah (Ionas), for whom God fulfilled the purport of His promise.
- Peace be upon Ezra (Uzair), whom God brought to life after his death.
- Peace be upon Zechariah, who remained patient in his tribulations.
- Peace be upon Saint John the Baptist, whom God drew near his rank by his martyrdom.
- Peace be upon Jesus Christ, the spirit of God and His word.
- Peace be upon Muhammad, the beloved of God and His elite.

== See also ==
- Ziyarat Ashura
- Battle of Karbala
- Rawda Khwani
- Arba'een Pilgrimage
