= Umm Ishaq bint Talha ibn Ubayd Allah =

Wife of Al-Hasan and daughter of Talha ibn Ubaydallah

Umm Isḥāq
- أم إسحاق

Personal life
- Spouse: Hasan ibn Ali (until his death in 2 April 670); Husayn ibn Ali (from 2 April 670 until his death in 10 October 680); Tammam ibn Abbas ibn Abd al-Muttalib; Abd Allah ibn Muhammad ibn Abd al-Rahman ibn Abi Bakr
- Children: Husayn al-Athram ibn Hasan; Talha ibn Hasan; Fatima bint Hasan; Fatima al-Kubra bint Husayn; Amina bint Abd Allah
- Parents: Talha ibn Ubayd Allah (father); al-Jarba bint Qasama (mother)

Religious life
- Religion: Islam

Umm Isḥāq bint Ṭalḥa ibn ʿUbayd Allāh (Arabic: أم إسحاق بنت طَلحَة بن عُبَيد الله) was the daughter of Talha and one of the wives of Hasan ibn Ali. After his death, she married Hasan's brother, Husayn ibn Ali.

== Biography ==
Umm Ishaq was the daughter of Talha ibn Ubayd Allah. She was reported to be among the most beautiful women of Quraysh.

Umm Ishaq was one of the wives of Hasan ibn Ali. After Hasan was killed, she married Husayn ibn Ali. After Husayn was killed, she married Abd Allah ibn Muhammad ibn Abd al-Rahman ibn Abi Bakr. It is said that before this marriage to Abd Allah, she had married Tammam ibn al-Abbas ibn Abd al-Muttalib.

== Children ==
Umm Ishaq had three children from Hasan ibn Ali: Husayn (who was known as al-Athram), Talha ibn Hasan, and Fatima bint Hasan.

She also had one daughter from Husayn: Fatima al-Kubra. She also bore a daughter, Amina to Abd Allah ibn Muhammad ibn Abd al-Rahman ibn Abi Bakr.
