= Ridwan ibn Walakhshi =

Egyptian Fatimid vizier from 1137 to 1139

- رضوان بن ولخشي

Vizier of the Fatimid Caliphate
- In office 5 February 1137 – 12 June 1139
- Monarch: al-Hafiz li-Din Allah
- Preceded by: Bahram al-Armani
- Succeeded by: Salim ibn Masal (as "supervisor of affairs", raised to vizier in 1149)

Personal details
- Died: 1148 Cairo
- Parent: Walakhshi
- Creed: Sunni
- Religion: Islam

Military service
- Allegiance: Fatimids
- Years of service: 1110s –1140s
- Rank: Commander

Ridwan ibn Walakhshi (Arabic: رضوان بن ولخشي) He was an Egyptian military commander, politician, and the vizier of the Fatimid Caliphate of Egypt in 1137–1139, under Caliph al-Hafiz li-Din Allah. He was a Sunni military commander, who rose to high offices under caliphs al-Amir bi-Ahkam Allah and al-Hafiz.

He participated in the coup of Kutayfat, which in 1130–1131 briefly overthrew the Fatimid dynasty, serving as gaoler of the future caliph al-Hafiz. Under al-Hafiz he rose to the powerful position of chamberlain, and emerged as the leader of the Muslim opposition during the vizierate of the Christian Bahram al-Armani in 1135–1137, when he served as governor of Ascalon and the western Nile Delta.

In February 1137, he rose in revolt against Bahram, drove him from Cairo, and was in turn appointed to the vizierate with the title of "Most Excellent King" (al-malik al-afdal) denoting his ambitions and status as a de facto monarch in his own right. His tenure lasted two years and five months, and was marked by a reorganization of the government and by a persecution of Christian officials, who were replaced by Muslims, as well as the introduction of restrictions on Christians and Jews. Ridwan also planned to depose al-Hafiz and the Fatimid dynasty in favour of a Sunni regime headed by himself, but the Caliph raised the army and the people of Cairo against him, forcing him to flee his post in June 1139. Ridwan rallied his followers and tried to capture Cairo, but was defeated and had to surrender.

He remained in confinement in the caliphal palace until he managed to escape by digging a tunnel in May 1148. Ridwan once again raised his followers into revolt, and managed to enter Cairo, but was assassinated shortly after by soldiers of the Caliph's bodyguard.

== Origin ==
Ridwan ibn Walakhshi was a Sunni Egyptian military officer. By the time of Kutayfat's anti-Fatimid coup in October 1130, he was considered one of the most prominent military commanders. He was involved in the coup, and was the gaoler of the Fatimid regent, Abd al-Majid, the future Caliph al-Hafiz, who had been deposed and imprisoned by Kutayfat. After Kutayfat was murdered by Fatimid loyalists and al-Hafiz was raised to the throne as caliph, Ridwan rose to the high office of head chamberlain (sahib al-bab). This post was junior only to the vizier, who by this time was an office of almost vice-regal power, its occupants being at the same time chief ministers in charge of all civil administration and heads of the army.

== Overthrow of Bahram ==
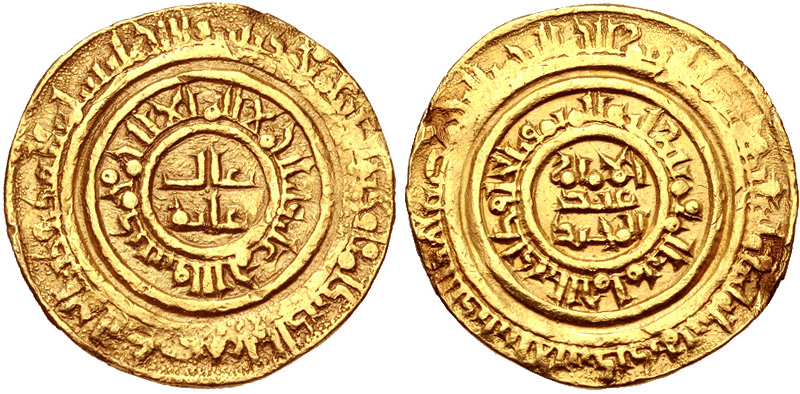
Gold dinar of al-Hafiz, minted at Alexandria in 1149

When the Armenian Bahram became vizier in 1135, Ridwan emerged as the leader of the Muslim reaction to Bahram's pro-Christian policies. Bahram tried to dispose of him by sending him to govern Ascalon in May 1135, but there Ridwan busied himself with blocking the Armenian immigration into Egypt, earning plaudits from the Muslim street of Cairo. As a result, Bahram recalled him in November 1136 and sent him to govern his own former province at Gharbiyya (the western Nile Delta).

The move backfired, as Ridwan was now placed in possession of an independent power base close to the capital: leading Cairene officials began making contact with him, and Ridwan did not hesitate to preach jihad against Bahram from the pulpit of the mosque. Finally, in early 1137, Ridwan raised an army from the local Bedouin and marched on Cairo. Echoing the Battle of Siffin in 657, his soldiers hung copies of the Quran from their lances. Bahram set out from Cairo to confront him, but his Muslim soldiers deserted to Ridwan, and Bahram had to withdraw to the city. On 3 February, the Armenian vizier fled Cairo with 2,000 Armenian soldiers, making for Qus, where his brother Vasak was governor.

At Qus, Bahram found his brother killed and defiled by the local townfolk. After plundering the city, Bahram made for Aswan on the southern border of the Fatimid realm, but the local governor barred his gates to him, and Bahram was forced to retreat to Akhmim. There Bahram accepted an offer of amnesty and protection (aman) by the Caliph, and entered a monastery near Akhmim.

== Vizierate ==
The Caliph's leniency towards Bahram is not surprising, as the Christian vizier was by far not as threatening to al-Hafiz' position as the Sunni Ridwan, who, in the words of the historian Michael Brett, "promised to be a second Nasir al-Dawla, threatening to turn the country over, not to Twelver Shi'ism like Kutayfat, but to Sunnism". Indeed, when Ridwan took office on 5 February 1137, his titles reflected his dangerously powerful position: the new vizier was not only the "Sword of Islam" (Sayf al-Islam), and chief qadi (qadi al-qudat) and chief missionary (da'i al-du'at); he was also the "Protector of Mankind" (Nasir al-A'nam). Instead of "Most Mighty and Excellent Lord" (al-sayyid al-ajall al-afdal), the title borne by the previous viziers, he was now "Most Excellent King" (al-malik al-afdal), and thus essentially a monarch independent of the imam-caliph al-Hafiz, whose name and office were left almost unmentioned in the titles Ridwan amassed. Ridwan's appointment thus marks the culmination of a process that made the Fatimid viziers into sultans, just as the Seljuk rulers had been vis-à-vis the Abbasid caliphs since the time of Tughril. The title of al-malik was continued by his successors, and via the last Fatimid vizier, Saladin, this practice passed on to the Ayyubid rulers.

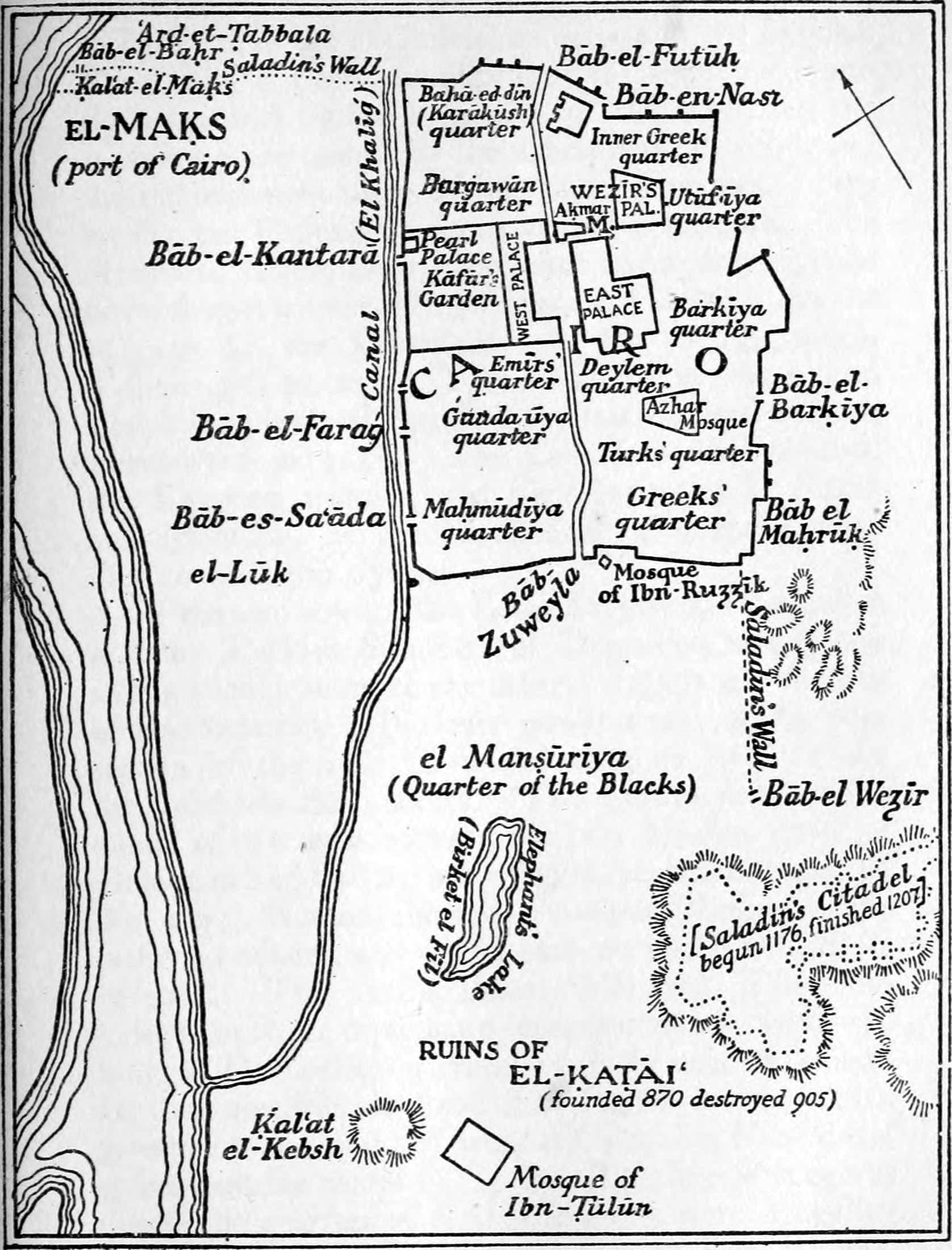
A plan of Fatimid-era Cairo, as reconstructed by Stanley Lane-Poole, showing the approximate layout of the city and the location of the Fatimid Great Palaces

As vizier, Ridwan launched an anti-Christian persecution. Christian officials were replaced with Muslims, their properties confiscated, and some were even executed. Restrictive and discriminatory sumptuary laws and regulations were introduced for Christians and Jews, requiring them to wear specific clothes, prohibiting them from riding horses, dismount when passing by a mosque, etc. The poll tax (jizya) was redefined, and was required to be paid to an official sitting at a bench set at head height, as a sign of inferiority of the Christians. Bahram's Armenian troops were disbanded, and were either settled as peasants or allowed to leave Egypt and return to their homeland. At the same time, Ridwan promoted Sunnism: a Shafi'i madrasa was established in Alexandria on the Syrian model. Ridwan also continued correspondence with the Burid rulers of Syria, particularly Shams al-Dawla Muhammad of Baalbek, for a common front against the Crusaders, but also possibly with the aim of using the Sunni Syrian troops to unseat the Fatimid dynasty.

Ridwan intended to emulate Kutayfat, who had used the vizierate as a means to depose the dynasty and ruled Egypt under his own name before his assassination by Fatimid loyalists, in order to depose the Fatimid dynasty outright and install a Sunni regime in Egypt under his leadership. In 1138, Ridwan began to cautiously move towards that goal, by consulting a Sunni (the head of the Alexandria madrasa, Ibn Awf), a Twelver (Ibn Abi Kamil), and an Isma'ili jurist (the chief missionary Isma'il ibn Salama) on the permissibility of deposing al-Hafiz. Their answers were fairly predictable: Ibn Abi Kamil argued that the claim to the imamate by al-Hafiz and his ancestors was false, Ibn Salama supported the Caliph, and Ibn Awf took a more cautious stance and advised vaguely that the deposition should be handled in accordance with the law. Ridwan began arresting and executing members of the Caliph's entourage, while al-Hafiz demonstratively recalled Bahram from exile and allowed him to settle in the caliphal palace. Ridwan in turn appeared in public on Eid al-Fitr on 31 May wearing a robe in a style normally reserved for monarchs.

Matters came to a head on 8 June 1139, as al-Hafiz, enthroned atop the Golden Gate of the palace, engaged in a heated exchange with Ridwan below. The vizier then ordered the palaces surrounded by troops, and brought forth one of the Caliph's sons, aiming to place him on the throne. This failed as the palace remained closed to him, and due to the resistance of Ibn Salama, who insisted that only the imam could sanction his successor by conferring nass (formal designation) upon him. This impasse allowed al-Hafiz to regain the initiative. The turncoat son and his followers were killed, and on 12 June a group of twenty men of the caliphal bodyguard entered the city through the Zuwayla Gate shouting "al-Hafiz, the Victorious" (al-Hafiz ya mansur). They were quickly joined by the populace and the bulk of the army, which rose in revolt against Ridwan. It was only with the assistance of his brother and nephew, and some loyal troops of the Rayhaniyya regiment, that allowed Ridwan to break through and escape the city via the Victory Gate, as the vizier's palace was plundered by the mob behind him.

Aided by the Bedouin in his employ, Ridwan fled to Ascalon and the Burid domains. The Burid governor of Salkhad, Kumushtakin, gave him a force of Turks, with whom Ridwan returned to Egypt. Rallying the Bedouin around him, he marched on Cairo, but was repulsed before the city gates on 28 August 1139. A month later, al-Hafiz led his army, comprising the Hafiziyya and Amiriyya regiments and his own bodyguard, to defeat Ridwan's forces. Like his rival Bahram, Ridwan fled to Upper Egypt, but soon had to surrender himself to the Caliph's forces in exchange for an aman. Al-Hafiz had Ridwan interned in the palace, in the room next to Bahram's, until the latter's death in November 1140.

== Rebellion and death ==
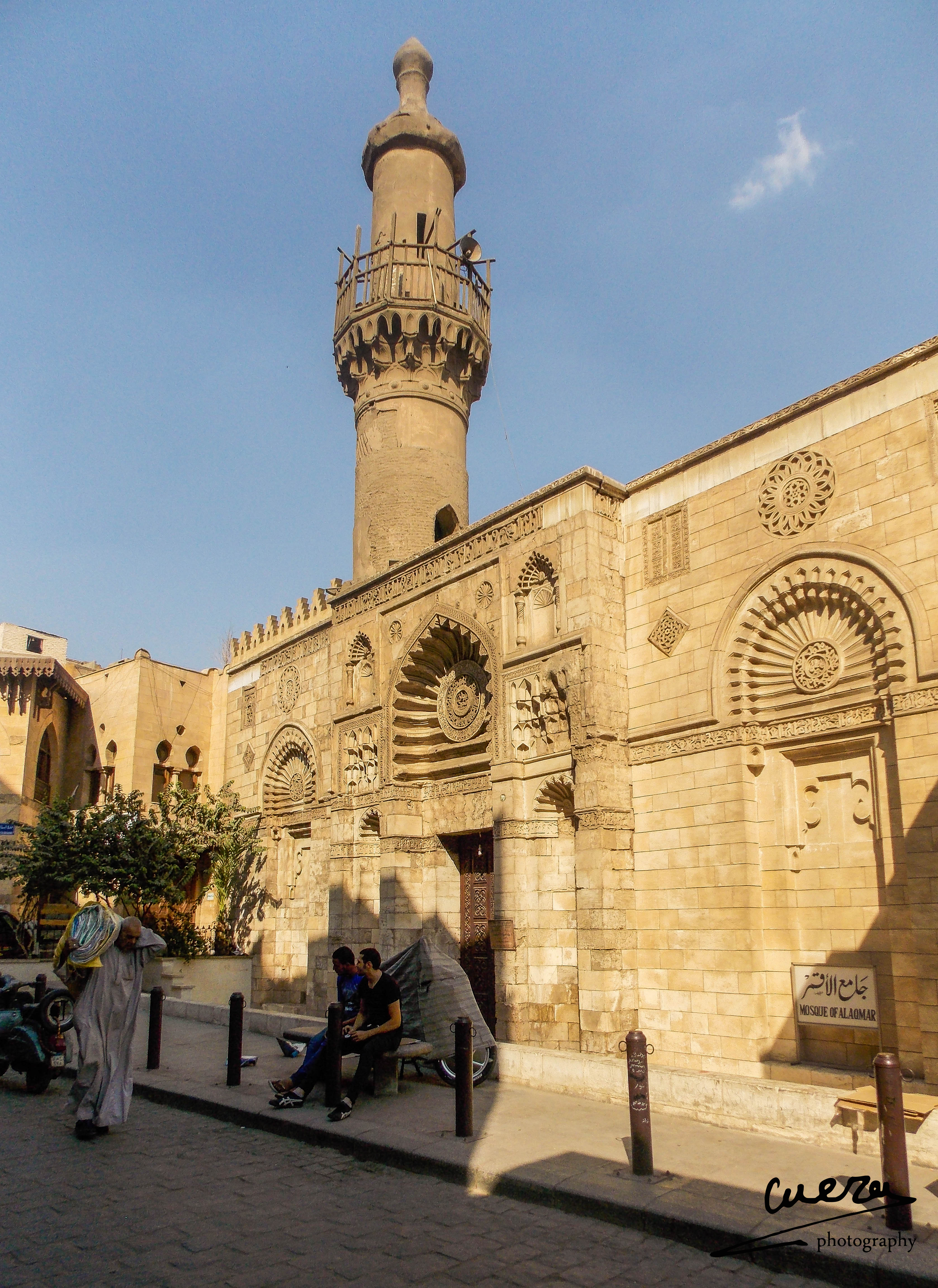
The Aqmar Mosque, near which Ridwan was killed

In May 1148, Ridwan managed to escape from the palace by means of a 35-cubit-long (approx. 18 m (60 ft)) tunnel he dug under the palace wall. He crossed the Nile to Giza and quickly rallied followers, including Bedouin, regular soldiers, and Luwata Berbers from the Western Desert. With this army he marched once more on Cairo, defeated the Caliph's troops at the Mosque of Ibn Tulun, and pursued them into the city itself. Al-Hafiz barred the gates of the palace, but pretended to be cooperative, and even sent some money when Ridwan asked for it to pay his men. At the same time, the Caliph selected ten black African members of the caliphal bodyguard to assassinate Ridwan. Near the Aqmar Mosque they started shouting "al-Hafiz, the Victorious". When Ridwan rose from his saddle to see what the commotion was about, they attacked and killed him and his brother. Their severed heads were brought to the Caliph, ending the uprising.

For the remainder of his reign, al-Hafiz no longer appointed any viziers, but rather chose secretaries (katib) to lead the administration. At some point in 1139/40, the Berber Salim ibn Masal, was appointed as "supervisor of affairs" (nazir fi'l-umur) or "supervisor of the public interests" (nazir fi'l-masalih), but the vizieral title was deliberately avoided, and Ibn Masal would be named vizier only after al-Hafiz's death. This was a conscious attempt to reverse the progressive transformation of the vizierate into a sultanate: unlike the powerful viziers, these secretaries were civilian bureaucrats, often non-Muslim, and utterly dependent on the Caliph.

== Sources ==
- al-Imad, Leila S. (1990). The Fatimid Vizierate (979-1172). Berlin: Klaus Schwarz Verlag. ISBN 3-922968-82-1.
- Brett, Michael (2017). The Fatimid Empire. The Edinburgh History of the Islamic Empires. Edinburgh: Edinburgh University Press. ISBN 978-0-7486-4076-8.
- Canard, Marius (1965). "Fāṭimids". In Lewis, B.; Pellat, Ch. & Schacht, J. (eds.). The Encyclopaedia of Islam, Second Edition. Volume II: C–G. Leiden: E. J. Brill. pp. 850–862. OCLC 495469475.
- Canard, Marius (1971). "Ibn Maṣāl". In Lewis, B.; Ménage, V. L.; Pellat, Ch. & Schacht, J. (eds.). The Encyclopaedia of Islam, Second Edition. Volume III: H–Iram. Leiden: E. J. Brill. p. 868. doi:10.1163/1573-3912_islam_SIM_3288. OCLC 495469525.
- Halm, Heinz (2014). Kalifen und Assassinen: Ägypten und der vordere Orient zur Zeit der ersten Kreuzzüge, 1074–1171 [Caliphs and Assassins: Egypt and the Near East at the Time of the First Crusades, 1074–1171] (in German). Munich: C.H. Beck. ISBN 978-3-406-66163-1.

Preceded by Bahram al-Armani	Vizier of the Fatimid Caliphate; 5 February 1137 – 12 June 1139	Vacant Personal rule by Caliph al-Hafiz Title next held by Ibn Masal
