= List of Fatimid caliphs =

Imam-Caliphs of the Fatimid Caliphate

Details
- First monarch: al-Mahdi
- Last monarch: al-Adid
- Formed: 909
- Abolished: 1171
- Residences: Raqqada (909–921); Mahdia (921–948); Mansuriyah (948–973); Cairo (973–1171)

The Fatimid caliphs were the holders of the Islamic title of caliph who were members of the Fatimid dynasty, claiming descent from Fatima, daughter of prophet Muhammad, and Ali, the fourth Rashidun caliph and cousin of Muhammad. Alongside the title of caliph, they were also regarded as the imams of the Isma'ili branch of Shi'a Islam.

== Fatimid Caliphs ==
The Fatimids came to power after their Isma'ili supporters conquered the Aghlabid emirate of Ifriqiya in 909. Adhering to the Isma'ili branch of Shi'a Islam, they were rivals to the Sunni Abbasid caliphs seated in Baghdad. From their seat in Ifriqiya, the Fatimids lead the conquest of Egypt, Levant and Hejaz. After the rise of Seljuks and arrival of European crusaders, the dynasty fell in a decline, and was formally ended by the vizier Saladin, who switched Egypt's allegiance to the Abbasid caliphs in 1171, giving rise to the Ayyubid sultanate.

No.	Coin	Name	Reign	Parents	Life details
1		al-Mahdi أبو محمد عبد الله بن الحسين المهدي بالله; Abū Muḥammad ʿAbd Allāh ibn al-Ḥusayn al-Mahdī bi'llāh	27 August 909 – 4 March 934 (~24 years)	al-Husayn ibn Ahmad	31 July 874 – 4 March 934 (aged 60): Claimed to be the mahdi and descendant of Fatima bint Muhammad.; Proclaimed caliph after Isma'ili takeover of Aghlabid Ifriqiya.; Mahdia founded as the capital (921)
2		al-Qa'im أبو القاسم محمد بن عبد الله القائم بأمر الله; Abū'l-Qāsim Muḥammad ibn ʿAbd Allāh al-Qāʾim bi-Amr Allāh	4 March 934 – 17 May 946 (~12 years)	al-Mahdi; Bint Abu'l-Shalaghlagh	March/April 893 – 17 May 946 (aged 53): Son and heir apparent of al-Mahdi.; Anti-Fatimid revolt in Sicily (937); Kharijite rebellion of Abu Yazid (944); Died during the siege of Mahdiya by rebels.
3		al-Mansur أبو طاهر إسماعيل بن محمد المنصور بنصر الله; Abū Ṭāhir Ismāʿīl ibn Muḥammad al-Manṣūr bi-Naṣr Allāh	17 May 946 – 18 March 953 (~7 years)	al-Qa'im; Karima, Ifriqiyan concubine	January 914 – 18 March 953 (aged 39): Reportedly heir apparent of al-Qa'im.; Subjugation of Abu Yazid's rebellion (947).; Kalbids appointed viceroys of Sicily (948).; Mansuriya founded as new capital (948).
4		al-Mu'izz أبو تميم معد بن إسماعيل المعز لدين الله; Abū Tamīm Maʿadd ibn Ismāʿīl al-Muʿizz li-Dīn Allāh	19 March 953 – 18 December 975 (~22 years)	al-Mansur	26 September 931 – 18 December 975 (aged 44): Heir apparent of al-Mansur.; Fatimid conquest of Egypt and Hejaz (969); Cairo founded as the capital (973); Zirids appointed viceroys of Ifriqiya (972)
5		al-Aziz أبو منصور نزار بن معد العزيز بالله; Abū Manṣūr Nizār ibn Maʿadd al-ʿAzīz bi'llāh	18 December 975 – 13 October 996 (~21 years)	al-Mu'izz; Durzan al-Mu'izziya	10 May 955 – 13 October 996 (aged 41): Named heir by al-Mu'izz.; Fatimid conquest of most of Syria.; Conflict with Byzantines over Aleppo.; Fatimid authority recognized in Yemen (992).
6		al-Hakim أبو علي منصور بن نزار الحاكم بأمر الله; Abū ʿAlī Manṣūr ibn Nizār al-Ḥākim bi-Amr Allāh	14 October 996 – 13 February 1021 (~25 years)	al-Aziz; al-Sayyida al-Aziziyyah	13 August 985 – 13 February 1021 (aged 36): Heir apparent of al-Aziz.; Destruction of the Church of Holy Sepulcher (1009); Baghdad Manifesto by Abbasids (1011); Considered divine figure in Druze religion.; Disappeared during a night excursion; likely murdered.
7		al-Zahir أبو الحسن علي بن منصور الظاهر لإعزاز دين الله; Abū'l-Ḥasan ʿAlī ibn Manṣūr al-Ẕāhir li-Iʿzāz Dīn Allāh	13 February 1021 – 13 June 1036 (~15 years)	al-Hakim; Amina bint Abdallah ibn al-Mu'izz	20 June 1005 – 13 June 1036 (aged 31): Raised to the throne by his aunt Sitt al-Mulk who bypassed al-Hakim's heir Abd al-Rahim ibn Ilyas.; De facto rule by Sitt al-Mulk till her death in 1023.
8		al-Mustansir أبو تميم معد بن علي المستنصر بالله; Abū Tamīm Maʿadd ibn ʿAlī al-Mustanṣir bi'llāh	13 June 1036 (Note: While the year 1035 is cited by some historians as the year in which he ascended the throne, the year 1036 is cited more frequently, particularly by Muslim scholars.) – 29 December 1094 (Note: His death date, when converted to the Western calendar, is sometimes given as 6 January 1095, but 29 December is the date commonly used.) (~59 years)	al-Zahir; Rasad, Nubian concubine	2 July 1029 – 29 December 1094 (aged 65): Zirid allegiance to Abbasids (1048); collapse of Kalbid rule (1053); loss of authority in Ifriqiya and Sicily.; Civil war between Turkic and Berber troops (1066).; Massive seven-year famine (1064-1071); De facto rule by viziers.; Longest-reigning caliph, Fatimid or otherwise.
9		al-Musta'li أبو القاسم أحمد بن معد المستعلي بالله; Abū'l-Qāsim Aḥmad ibn Maʿadd al-Mustaʿlī bi'llāh	29 December 1094 – 12 December 1101 (~6 years)	al-Mustansir	16 September 1074 – 12 December 1101 (aged 27): Installed by vizier al-Afdal as a puppet, bypassing his older brother Nizar.; Nizar's failed rebellion; Isma'ilis split into Musta'li and Nizari branches.; First Crusade; Jerusalem lost to Crusaders (1099)
10		al-Amir أبو علي منصور بن أحمد الآمر بأحكام الله; Abū ʿAlī Manṣūr ibn Aḥmad al-Āmir bi-Aḥkām Allāh	1101 – 8 October 1130 (~29 years)	al-Musta'li	31 December 1096 – 8 October 1130 (aged 34): Installed by al-Afdal, whom he possibly had assassinated later (1121); Killed by Nizari Isma'ili Assassins.
Interregnum & Civil War (Note: al-Amir was only survived by the infant al-Tayyib. Abd al-Majid, the oldest surviving grandson of al-Mustansir, took over as regent. The army rebelled and installed Kutayfat as vizier, who tried to abolish the dynasty, but was killed by Fatimid loyalists.) (1130-1132)
11		al-Hafiz أبو الميمون عبد المجيد بن محمد الحافظ لدين الله; Abū'l-Maymūn ʿAbd al-Majīd ibn Muḥammad al-Ḥāfiẕ li-Dīn Allāh	23 January 1132 – 8 October 1149 (~17 years)	Muhammad ibn al-Mustansir	1074/5 – 8 October 1149 (aged 75): Cousin of al-Amir; claimed caliphate after Kutayfat's demise; Musta'li Isma'ilis split into Hafizi and Tayyibi branches.
12		al-Zafir أبو منصور إسماعيل بن عبد المجيد الظافر بأمر الله; Abū Manṣūr Ismāʿīl ibn ʿAbd al-Majīd al-Ẕāfir bi-Amr Allāh	1149 – March 1154 (~5 years)	al-Hafiz	February 1133 – March 1154 (aged 21): Ascalon falls to Crusaders (1153); complete loss of Levant.; Murdered by vizier Abbas ibn Abi al-Futuh.
13		al-Fa'iz أبو القاسم عيسى بن إسماعيل الفائز بنصر الله; Abū'l-Qāsim ʿĪsā ibn Ismāʿīl al-Fāʾiz bi-Naṣr Allāh	1154 – 23 July 1160 (~6 years)	al-Zafir	1149 – 23 July 1160 (aged 11): Son of al-Zafir; installed by Abbas as a child.; Died from an epileptic seizure.
14		al-Adid أبو محمد عبد الله بن يوسف العاضد لدين الله; Abū Muḥammad ʿAbd Allāh ibn Yūsuf al-ʿĀḍid li-Dīn Allāh	1160 – 13 September 1171 (~11 years)	Yusuf ibn al-Hafiz	16 May 1151 – 13 September 1171 (aged 20): Cousin of al-Fa'iz; installed by Ibn Ruzzik.; Rise of Saladin as vizier; proclamation of Abbasid suzerainty (1171).; End of the Fatimid caliphate; Ayyubid rule begins.

== Genealogy ==
Family tree of the Fatimid dynasty

Abu Muhammad Abdallah **al-Mahdi bi'llah** (r. 909–934)
Abu'l-Qasim Muhammad **al-Qa'im bi-Amr Allah** (r. 934–946)	Abu Ali Ahmad	Other children
al-Qasim^{§}	Abu Tahir Isma'il **al-Mansur bi'llah** (r. 946–953)	Other children
Abu Tamim Ma'ad **al-Mu'izz li-Din Allah** (r. 953–975)	Abd al-Rahim^{§}
Tamim	Abdallah^{§}	Abu Mansur Nizar **al-Aziz bi'llah** (r. 975–996)	Other children
Amina	Abu Ali Mansur **al-Hakim bi-Amr Allah** (r. 996–1021)	Sitt al-Mulk	Other children
Abu'l-Hasan Ali **al-Zahir li-I'zaz Din Allah** (r. 1021–1036)
Abu Tamim Ma'ad **al-Mustansir bi'llah** (r. 1036–1094)
Abu Mansur Nizar^{§} (elder son)	Abu Abdallah	Abdallah	Isma'il	Abu'l-Qasim Muhammad	Other children	Abu'l-Qasim Ahmad **al-Musta'li bi'llah** (r. 1094–1101)
al-Husayn	Nizari imams (claimed descent)	Abu'l-Maymun Abd al-Majid **al-Hafiz li-Din Allah** (r. 1132–1149)	Abu Ali Mansur **al-Amir bi-Ahkam Allah** (r. 1101–1130)	Ja'far	Other children
Sulayman^{§}	Haydara^{§}	Hasan^{§}	Abu Mansur Isma'il **al-Zafir bi-Amr Allah** (r. 1149–1154)	Yusuf	Other children	Abu'l-Qasim al-Tayyib^{§}
Abu'l-Qasim Isa **al-Fa'iz bi-Nasr Allah** (r. 1154–1160)	Abu Muhammad Abdallah **al-Adid li-Din Allah** (r. 1160–1171)	Tayyibi hidden imams (claimed descent)
Dawud
Sulayman

^{§} denotes designated heirs who did not accede to the throne
denotes ruling Fatimid caliphs (with regnal names in **bold** and regnal dates)

== See also ==
- List of Caliphs
- List of rulers of Egypt
- List of Ismaili imams

== Sources ==
- Abun-Nasr, Jamil (1987). A history of the Maghrib in the Islamic period. Cambridge University Press. ISBN 0521337674.
- Bianquis, Thierry (2002). "al-Ẓāhir li-Iʿzāz Dīn Allāh". In Bearman, P. J.; Bianquis, Th.; Bosworth, C. E.; van Donzel, E. & Heinrichs, W. P. (eds.). The Encyclopaedia of Islam, Second Edition. Volume XI: W–Z. Leiden: E. J. Brill. pp. 391–392. doi:10.1163/1573-3912_islam_SIM_8080. ISBN 978-90-04-12756-2.
- Brett, Michael (2001). The Rise of the Fatimids: The World of the Mediterranean and the Middle East in the Fourth Century of the Hijra, Tenth Century CE. The Medieval Mediterranean. Vol. 30. Leiden: BRILL. ISBN 9004117415.
- Daftary, Farhad (2007). The Ismāʿı̄lı̄s: Their History and Doctrines (Second ed.). Cambridge: Cambridge University Press. ISBN 978-0-521-61636-2.
- Dachraoui, F. (1991). "al-Manṣūr Bi'llāh". In Bosworth, C. E.; van Donzel, E. & Pellat, Ch. (eds.). The Encyclopaedia of Islam, Second Edition. Volume VI: Mahk–Mid. Leiden: E. J. Brill. pp. 434–435. ISBN 978-90-04-08112-3.
- Halm, Heinz (1991). Das Reich des Mahdi: Der Aufstieg der Fatimiden [The Empire of the Mahdi: The Rise of the Fatimids] (in German). Munich: C. H. Beck. ISBN 978-3-406-35497-7.
- Halm, Heinz (2015). "Prinzen, Prinzessinnen, Konkubinen und Eunuchen am fatimidischen Hof" [Princes, Princesses, Concubines and Eunuchs at the Fatimid Court]. In Pomerantz, Maurice A.; Shahin, Aram A. (eds.). The Heritage of Arabo-Islamic Learning. Studies Presented to Wadad Kadi (in German). Leiden and Boston: Brill. pp. 91–110. ISBN 978-90-04-30590-8.
- Kennedy, Hugh (2004) [1986]. The Prophet and the Age of the Caliphates: The Islamic Near East from the 6th to the 11th Century (Second ed.). Harlow: Longman. ISBN 978-0-582-40525-7.
- Kupferschmidt, Uri M. (1987). The Supreme Muslim Council: Islam Under the British Mandate for Palestine. BRILL. ISBN 978-90-04-07929-8.
- Metcalfe, Alex (2009). The Muslims of Medieval Italy. Edinburgh: Edinburgh University Press. ISBN 978-0-7486-2008-1.
- Walker, Paul E. (1998). "The Ismāʿīlī Daʿwa and the Fāṭimid Caliphate". In Petry, Carl F. (ed.). The Cambridge History of Egypt: Islamic Egypt, 640–1517. Vol. 1. Cambridge: Cambridge University Press. pp. 120–150. ISBN 0-521-47137-0.
