= Abu'l-Fath Yanis =

Armenian military slave

Vizier of the Fatimid Caliphate
- In office 1131-1132
- Preceded by: Kutayfat
- Succeeded by: Sulayman ibn al-Hafiz

Personal details
- Born: Abu'-Fatḥ Nāṣir al-Juyūsh Sayf al-Islām Sharaf al-Islām Yānis al-Rūmī al-Armanī al-Ḥāfiẓī
- Died: 1132
- Cause of death: Poisoning
- Children: 2+

Abu'-Fatḥ Nāṣir (or Amīr) al-Juyūsh Sayf al-Islām Sharaf al-Islām Yānis al-Rūmī al-Armanī al-Ḥāfiẓī, commonly simply known by his given name Yānis (i.e., John), was an Armenian military slave who served as vizier of the Fatimid Caliphate for nine months in 1131–1132.

== Life ==
A Christian of Armenian origin, he became a military slave (mamlūk) of al-Afdal Shahanshah, the vizier (and de facto ruler) of the Fatimid Caliphate from 1094 to 1121. In 1122/3, Yanis was promoted to head of the ṣibyān al-khāṣṣ—a special corps of young men being trained for military service—and then to head of the treasury (ṣāḥib bayt al-mal) by the vizier al-Ma'mun al-Bata'ihi. He rose further to head chamberlain (ṣāḥib al-bāb or ṣāḥib al-majlis), a rank almost equal to the vizierate, and commander-in-chief of the army.

Following the death of Caliph al-Amir bi-Ahkam Allah on 17 October 1130, the army raised al-Afdal's son Kutayfat to the vizierate. He soon imprisoned the regent Abd al-Majid, deposed the Fatimid dynasty and Isma'ilism and imposed a Twelver Shi'a regime instead. This aroused the reaction of the old Fatimid elites, and members of al-Amir's ṣibyān al-khāṣṣ murdered Kutayfat on 8 December 1131. Abd al-Majid was released and reinstated, initially as regent, but in February 1132 he was raised to the caliphate as al-Hafiz li-Din Allah. Yanis emerged as the new strong man, and was named vizier. This has been seen by some modern historians as a reward for assisting in the murder of Kutayfat and the restoration of the dynasty. On the other hand, among his first moves was the elimination of about 300 of the approximately 500 ṣibyān, exactly the same corps that had been responsible for Kutayfat's murder.

This severity was a hallmark of Yanis, a strong personality and disciplinarian who tried to discipline the unruly army by tough measures. At the same time, he relied on a privately raised regiment of military slaves, which was known after him as Yānisiyya. Yanis' efforts to impose control over the state extended to the administration as well, leading to the imprisonment of several prominent officials. His growing power alarmed al-Hafiz, and after nine months in power, he had the vizier's ablution water poisoned. After Yanis' death, the Caliph did not appoint another vizier, and for a time took governance into his own hands. It was not until 1134 that a new vizier was appointed, in the person of al-Hafiz's son and designated heir Sulayman.

During his tenure, Yanis began constructing two mosques, the Masjid al-Fath and the Masjid Yanis, which were completed by his two sons, whom al-Hafiz took under his protection.

== Sources ==
- al-Imad, Leila S. (1990). The Fatimid Vizierate (979-1172). Berlin: Klaus Schwarz Verlag. ISBN 3-922968-82-1.
- Dedoyan, Seta B. (1997). The Fatimid Armenians: Cultural and Political Interaction in the Near East. Leiden, New York, and Köln: Brill. ISBN 90-04-10816-5.
- Dedoyan, Seta B. (2002). "Yānis". In Bearman, P. J.; Bianquis, Th.; Bosworth, C. E.; van Donzel, E. & Heinrichs, W. P. (eds.). The Encyclopaedia of Islam, Second Edition. Volume XI: W–Z. Leiden: E. J. Brill. pp. 281–282. doi:10.1163/1573-3912_islam_SIM_7980. ISBN 978-90-04-12756-2.
- Halm, Heinz (2014). Kalifen und Assassinen: Ägypten und der vordere Orient zur Zeit der ersten Kreuzzüge, 1074–1171 [Caliphs and Assassins: Egypt and the Near East at the Time of the First Crusades, 1074–1171] (in German). Munich: C.H. Beck. ISBN 978-3-406-66163-1.
- Stern, S. M. (1960). "al-Afḍal, Abū ʿAlī Aḥmad, surnamed Kutayfāt". In Gibb, H. A. R.; Kramers, J. H.; Lévi-Provençal, E.; Schacht, J.; Lewis, B. & Pellat, Ch. (eds.). The Encyclopaedia of Islam, Second Edition. Volume I: A–B. Leiden: E. J. Brill. p. 216. doi:10.1163/1573-3912_islam_SIM_0339. OCLC 495469456.

Preceded by Kutayfat	Vizier of the Fatimid Caliphate; 1131–1132	Vacant Title next held by Sulayman ibn al-Hafiz
