= Sulayman ibn al-Hafiz =

Eldest son of Fatimid caliph al-Ḥāfiẓ li-Dīn Allāh

Crown Prince of Fatimid
- Term: 1132-1134
- Successor: Haydara ibn Al-Hafiz
- Reign: 1134

Grand Vizier of Fatimid
- Term: 1134 (two months)
- Predecessor: Abu'l-Fath Yanis
- Successor: Haydara ibn Al-Hafiz
- Born: 1100
- Died: 1134 (aged 34)
- Father: al-Hafiz li-Din Allah

Sulaymān ibn al-Ḥāfiẓ was the oldest son of the eleventh Fatimid caliph and imam of Hafizi Isma'ilism, al-Hafiz. Designated as heir-apparent, he served as vizier for two months in 1134, before his death in office.

== Life ==
Sulayman was the oldest son of the Fatimid caliph al-Hafiz (r. 1132–1149). Al-Hafiz had come to the throne under dubious circumstances, and was not the son of the previous caliph, al-Amir, but his cousin. This event created a crisis of legitimacy, and a schism among the Isma'ili faithful, dividing them into the Hafizi and Tayyibi branches.

After disposing of the too powerful vizier Abu'l-Fath Yanis, al-Hafiz initially ruled without a vizier who might threaten his throne. In 1134, al-Hafiz appointed Sulayman both as heir-apparent (wali ahd al-muslimin) and vizier. It was the first time that a Fatimid prince, or even the heir-apparent, had been appointed to the vizierate. With this unusual conferment of plenipotentiary power in Sulayman's hands, the caliph intended to solidify the succession in his line, but Sulayman died two months later.

This once more called into question the supposed infallibility of al-Hafiz as the Isma'ili imam. Sulayman's younger brother Haydara was immediately appointed as heir and vizier, but this provoked the jealousy of another of al-Hafiz's sons, Hasan, who rebelled against his brother and father and seized the vizierate, only to be killed after a brief reign of terror by a military strongman, Bahram al-Armani.

== Sources ==
- Brett, Michael (2017). The Fatimid Empire. The Edinburgh History of the Islamic Empires. Edinburgh: Edinburgh University Press. ISBN 978-0-7486-4076-8.
- Daftary, Farhad (2007). The Ismāʿı̄lı̄s: Their History and Doctrines (Second ed.). Cambridge: Cambridge University Press. ISBN 978-0-521-61636-2.
- Halm, Heinz (2014). Kalifen und Assassinen: Ägypten und der vordere Orient zur Zeit der ersten Kreuzzüge, 1074–1171 [Caliphs and Assassins: Egypt and the Near East at the Time of the First Crusades, 1074–1171] (in German). Munich: C. H. Beck. doi:10.17104/9783406661648-1. ISBN 978-3-406-66163-1.

Vacant Title last held by Abu'l-Fath Yanis	Vizier of the Fatimid Caliphate; 1134	Succeeded by Haydara ibn al-Hafiz
