= Bahram al-Armani =

Fatimid vizier from 1135 to 1137

Abu'l Muzaffar Bahram al-Armani al-Hafizi (Arabic: بهرام) was the vizier of the Fatimid Caliphate in 1135–1137, under the Caliph al-Hafiz li-Din Allah.

== Biography ==
According to a tradition, Bahram came from a noble family in the Armenian settlement of Tell Bashir, but it remains uncertain when and why he joined Fatimid services. His brother was the first Armenian metropolitan of Egpt, Gregory, who is called in some sources even Armenian Patriarch of Catholicos. Bahram took the military career and became governor of the western province of the Delta (al-Gharbiyya).

During the infighting between the two sons of caliph al-Hafiz, Haydara and Hasan, Bahram was called to aid prince Hasan. However, when Bahram arrived with his troops in Cairo, Hasan had been already assassinated. Upon arrival of Bahram, the Armenian troops in the city forced the caliph to proclaim Bahram, though he was a Christian, as vizier. On 4. April 1135, Bahram received the clothes and titles of a vizier and it seems that his commonly used title was Tag al-Dawla (crown of the realm). He did not receive those customary titles of the Fatimid viziers that implied control over the Muslim religious establishment (qāḍī al-quḍāt and dāʿī al-duʿāt).

The appointment of a Christian to the post of vizier provoked much opposition among the Muslims, as the office was seen as the representative of the imam-caliph, and entailed ritual roles in Islamic ceremonies and precedence over Muslim clerics. This and the pro-Armenian policy of Bahram led to a military revolt of the new governor of al-Gharbiyya, Ridwan ibn Walakhshi, who preached jihād against Bahram raised an army of Bedouins and marched on Cairo. Bahram's Muslim soldiers deserted him, and on 3 February he abandoned Cairo with troops loyal to him, making for Qus, where his brother was governor. After his departure, an anti-Armenian pogrom broke out in the capital, and even the vizieral palace was plundered and the remains of Bahram's brother Gregory.

However, before Bahram's arrival in Qus, Bahram's brother had been killed by the local population. In revenge, Bahram plundered the city, but resisted calls to torch it so as not to fully alienate the caliph. Bahram then continued to Aswan on the southern border of the Fatimid realm — some sources claim that he had intended to found a new realm allied with the Christian kingdoms of Nubia to the south — but the local governor barred his gates to him, and Bahram was forced to retreat to the White Monastery close to Akhmim. There a letter from al-Hafiz reached him, offering lenient terms: he could choose either a governorship at Qus, Akhmim, or Asyut, but could keep only a fraction of his followers, or he could enter a monastery near Akhmim, with a letter of protection (amān) for himself and his relatives. Bahram chose the latter.

== Sources ==
- al-Imad, Leila S. (1990). The Fatimid Vizierate (979-1172). Berlin: Klaus Schwarz Verlag. ISBN 3-922968-82-1., pp. 109–117
- Brett, Michael (2017). The Fatimid Empire. The Edinburgh History of the Islamic Empires. Edinburgh: Edinburgh University Press. ISBN 978-0-7486-4076-8.
- Canard, Marius (1960). "Bahrām". In Gibb, H. A. R.; Kramers, J. H.; Lévi-Provençal, E.; Schacht, J.; Lewis, B. & Pellat, Ch. (eds.). The Encyclopaedia of Islam, Second Edition. Volume I: A–B. Leiden: E. J. Brill. pp. 939–940. doi:10.1163/1573-3912_islam_SIM_1070. OCLC 495469456.
- Dadoyan, Seta B. (1997). The Fatimid Armenians: Cultural and Political Interaction in the Near East. Leiden, New York, and Köln: Brill. ISBN 90-04-10816-5.
- Dadoyan, Seta B. (2011). "Bahrām". In Fleet, Kate; Krämer, Gudrun; Matringe, Denis; Nawas, John; Rowson, Everett (eds.). Encyclopaedia of Islam (3rd ed.). Brill Online. doi:10.1163/1573-3912_ei3_COM_23807. ISSN 1873-9830.
- Halm, Heinz (2014). Kalifen und Assassinen: Ägypten und der vordere Orient zur Zeit der ersten Kreuzzüge, 1074–1171 [Caliphs and Assassins: Egypt and the Near East at the Time of the First Crusades, 1074–1171] (in German). Munich: C.H. Beck. ISBN 978-3-406-66163-1.

Preceded by Hasan ibn al-Hafiz	Vizier of the Fatimid Caliphate; 1135–1137	Succeeded by Ridwan ibn Walakhshi
