= Kutayfat =

12th-century Egyptian vizier and army commander

Kutayfāt, also known as Abu Ali Ahmad ibn al-Afdal or al-Afdal Kutayfāt, (d. 1131) was vizier and amīr al-juyūsh (commander of the armies) to al-Hafiz, Caliph of Egypt, from 1130 to 1131. He seized power by imprisoning al-Hafiz, proclaimed the dynasty deposed and abandoned Isma'ilism as the state religion in favour of a vaguely Twelver form of Shi'ism with himself as vicegerent of a hidden imam. but was murdered by Fatimid forces loyal to the caliph. Kutayfāt was the son of al-Afdal Shahanshah and grandson of Badr al-Jamali, and so the third generation of Armenians serving as Fatimid vizier.
