= Nass (Islam) =

Legal concept

Nass (Arabic: نَصّ, romanized: naṣṣ) is an Arabic word variously translated as "a known, clear legal injunction," a "divine decree", a "designation", "written law" as opposed to unwritten law, "canonical text" that forbids or requires, a "textual proof".

In Shia Islam (Twelver and Isma'ili), nass refers specifically to the designation of an infallible Imam by a previous infallible Imam.
