= Heinz Halm =

German scholar of Islamic Studies (born 1942)

Heinz Halm (born 21 February 1942 in Andernach, Rhine Province) is a German scholar of Islamic Studies, with a particular expertise on early Shia history, the Ismailites and other Shia sects.

== Life ==
Born and raised in Andernach, Halm studied Islamic and Semitic studies, and medieval and modern history at the University of Bonn, where he was a scholar of Annemarie Schimmel. Following his Ph.D. and a traineeship in journalism at Hessischer Rundfunk, he joined the scholarly project of the Tübinger Atlas des Vorderen Orients (Tuebingen Atlas of the Near & Middle East), a bilingual (German/English) collection of geographical and historical maps. In 1980, he was appointed Professor for Islamic Studies at the University of Tübingen.

== Work ==
Halm's book The Shiites was reviewed in the International Journal of Middle East Studies by Said Amir Arjomand who remarked that "Halm’s historical perspective is a welcome corrective to the ahistorical shallowness of the vast majority of the accounts of the Islamic Revolution." Arjomand recommends the book as "a short historical introduction to Shi`ism, it is serviceable to the general public and has no rival or substitute.”

- Halm, Heinz; Faroqhi, Suraiya; Gronke, Monika, eds. (2012). "The Arabs". History of the Middle East: A Compilation. Princeton Series on the Middle East. Princeton, NJ: Markus Wiener Publishers. ISBN 9781558765702.
- Die Araber: Von der vorislamischen Zeit bis zur Gegenwart (in German) (4th ed.). C.H. Beck. 2015. ISBN 978-3-406-68284-1.

- The Arabs: A Short History (with documents). Markus Wiener Publishers. 2012. ISBN 9781558765450.

- Die Schiiten (in German) (2nd ed.). C.H. Beck. 2015. ISBN 978-3-406-67716-8.

- The Shiites: A Short History. Princeton, NJ: Markus Wiener Publishers. 2007. ISBN 9781558764378.

- Der Islam: Geschichte und Gegenwart (in German) (10th ed.). C.H. Beck. 2015. ISBN 978-3-406-62886-3.
- Kalifen und Assassinen. Ägypten und der Vordere Orient zur Zeit der ersten Kreuzzüge 1074-1171 (in German). C.H. Beck. 2014. ISBN 978-3-406-66163-1.
- Das Reich des Mahdi: Der Aufstieg der Fatimiden (875—973) (in German). Munchen: C.H.Beck. 1991. ISBN 978-3-406-35497-7.
  - The Empire of the Mahdi The Rise of the Fatimids. Translated by Bonner, Michael. Leiden and New York: E.J. Brill. 1996. ISBN 978-90-04-10056-5.
- Der Schiitische Islam: Von Der Religion Zur Revolution [Shi’a Islam: From Religion to Revolution] (in German). C.H. Beck. 1994. ISBN 978-3-406-37437-1.

- Shi'a Islam: From Religion to Revolution. Princeton Series on the Middle East. Princeton, NJ: Markus Wiener Publishers. 1997 [1994]. ISBN 978-1558761346.
