= Dirgham =

al-Malik al-Manṣūr Fāris al-Muslimīn Shams al-Khilāfa Dirgham
- أبو الأشبال ضرغام بن عامر بن سوار اللخمي

Wazīr of the Fatimid Caliphate
- In office 31 August 1163 – May/June or July/August 1164
- Monarchs: al-Adid li-Dīnallāh (as Fatimid Caliph)
- Preceded by: Shawar ibn Mujir al-Sa'di
- Succeeded by: Shawar ibn Mujir al-Sa'di

Sāḥib al-bāb of the Fatimid Caliphate
- In office January 1163 – 31 August 1163
- Monarch: al-Adid li-Dīnallāh (as Fatimid Caliph)
- Governor: Shawar ibn Mujir al-Sa'di (as Fatimid Wazīr)

Nāʾib al-bāb of the Fatimid Caliphate
- In office ? – January 1163
- Monarch: al-Adid li-Dīnallāh (as Fatimid Caliph)
- Governor: Tala'i ibn Ruzzik (as Fatimid Wazīr); Ruzzik ibn Tala'i (as Fatimid Wazīr)

Personal details
- Born: Alexandria, Fatimid Caliphate
- Died: May/June or July/August 1164 Fustat, Fatimid Caliphate
- Occupation: Military commander, vizier

Abu'l-Ashbāl al-Ḍirghām ibn ʿĀmir ibn Sawwār al-Lukhamī (Arabic: أبو الأشبال ضرغام بن عامر بن سوار اللخمي) (fl. 1153–1164) was an Arab military commander in the service of the Fatimid Caliphate. An excellent warrior and model cavalier, he rose to higher command and scored some successes against the Kingdom of Jerusalem as well as against internal rebellions. Despite his close personal ties to the viziers Tala'i ibn Ruzzik and his son Ruzzik ibn Tala'i, he joined Shawar when the latter rebelled against Ruzzik and seized the vizierate. Nine months later, Dirgham betrayed Shawar as well and expelled him from the capital, becoming vizier himself on 31 August 1163. Amidst yet another Crusader invasion in 1164, Dirgham clashed with Shawar, who had gained the support of Syrian troops led by Shirkuh. Deserted by most of his troops, Dirgham was killed sometime in May–August 1164 by Shawar's army.

== Life ==
Dirgham was of Arab origin, and his nisbas of al-Lakhmī and al-Mundhirī possibly indicate descent from the pre-Islamic Lakhmid kings of al-Hira. He was born in Alexandria and was a Sunni. The accounts of the historians Umara al-Yamani and al-Maqrizi emphasize his equestrian and soldierly skills, being an expert in handling both the spear and the bow; as well as his penmanship and ability as a poet and as a literary critic. Dirgham had three brothers, Humam (later awarded the laqab of Nāṣir al-Dīn, "Defender of the Faith"), Mulham (Nāṣir al-Muslimīn, "Defender of the Muslims"), and Husam (Fakhr al-Dīn, "Glory of the Faith").

=== Early career ===
He is first mentioned in the sources in 1153, as part of an expedition to relieve the city of Ascalon, which was being besieged by King Baldwin III of Jerusalem. The expedition was led by Abbas, the stepson of the vizier al-Adil ibn al-Sallar; Abbas abandoned the campaign and returned to Cairo where he killed his stepfather and took over the vizierate until himself overthrown by Tala'i ibn Ruzzik in 1154. Abandoned to its fate, Ascalon, the last Fatimid stronghold in the Levant, fell on 22 August 1153.

Dirgham appears to have been a close ally of Tala'i ibn Ruzzik, who made him commander of a new military corps, the Barqiyya. He even instructed the vizier's son, Ruzzik, in knightly activities (furūsiyya), and quickly rose in the court hierarchy to the position of nāʾib al-bāb (deputy to the powerful post of grand chamberlain, ṣāḥib al-bāb, second in rank only to the vizier). As Tala'i resumed a more aggressive stance against the Crusaders, Dirgham led expeditions against them in 1157 and 1158, and scored a victory against them on 9 March 1158 at Tell el-Ajjul. In 1159, along with Ruzzik, he suppressed the rebellion of Bahram at Atfih in Upper Egypt.

In 1161, Tala'i was assassinated and was succeeded by his son Ruzzik. In September 1162, King Amalric of Jerusalem invaded Egypt to claim the tribute that had been promised by Ruzzik's father. Dirgham led the forces mustered to oppose the invasion, but was defeated and retreated to Bilbays. He was able to block Amalric's advance by breaching the dikes of the Nile, which was then in flood. After Amalric withdrew to Palestine, Dirgham helped suppress another revolt in the Gharbiyya (the western Nile Delta) province. Soon after, however, Shawar, the governor of Qus, also rose in revolt, raised an army of Bedouin from the western oases, and overthrew and killed Ruzzik and became vizier himself in January 1163. Despite his own ties to Ruzzik, like many other commanders Dirgham chose to join Shawar once the latter's victory became inevitable, and was rewarded with the second most powerful position in the state, that of ṣāḥib al-bāb.

During his career, Dirgham received the honorific laqabs of Fāris al-Muslimīn ("Knight of the Muslims") and Shams al-Khilāfa ("Sun of the Caliphate").

=== Vizierate ===
Political map of the Levant in c. 1165

Shawar was borne to success by his fellow Bedouin, and as a reward he not only gave them Ruzzik's wealth, but also allowed them free rein to raid the eastern Nile Delta, where the estates of the military tax-farmers (muqṭāʿūn), which were supporting a large part of the Fatimid army, were located. As a result, a large part of the military turned against Shawar, and Dirgham, who had the backing of the Barqiyya corps as their commander, emerged as its leader. Shawar reportedly suspected something and made Dirgham swear repeated oaths of obedience and loyalty, but in August 1163, clashes broke out. Two of Shawar's sons may have been killed and the oldest, Tayy, was captured (and later executed), forcing Shawar to flee Cairo. On 31 August 1163, Dirgham was appointed vizier with the title of al-Malik al-Manṣūr ("the Victorious King"). According to al-Maqrizi, as vizier Dirgham was greatly influenced by his brothers Humam (who also took Dirgham's former title of Fāris al-Muslimīn) and Husam.

In the meantime, Shawar fled to Damascus, where he sought the aid of the Sunni ruler of Syria, Nur al-Din. Dirgham attempted to thwart his rival's plans by opening negotiations with Nur al-Din for an alliance against the Crusaders, but the Syrian ruler's reply was non-committal, and on his way to Egypt, Dirgham's envoy was arrested by the Crusaders, possibly on the instigation of Nur al-Din himself. Dirgham also faced domestic challenges, as many of the Barqiyya commanders envied him and themselves made contact with Shawar. Dirgham set an ambush and killed seventy of them, including many of their followers. While this secured his position for a time, it also deprived him of able officers, thus weakening the Fatimid army. His execution by crucifixion of the governor of Alexandria also cost him whatever good will he initially had, so that he could only rely on his personal entourage.

In the winter of 1163/64, King Amalric invaded Egypt with the intention of occupying the country. Dirgham preferred to negotiate with Amalric, offering him a peace treaty guaranteed by the surrender of hostages, and the payment of an annual tribute. In the meantime, however, Shawar and Nur al-Din had allied themselves—Shawar reportedly offered to hand over one third of the annual land tax (kharāj) revenue to Nur al-Din—and a Syrian army under the Kurdish commander Shirkuh (accompanied by his nephew, Saladin) was sent to Egypt. While Nur al-Din manoeuvred to attract the Crusaders' attention away from the expeditionary force, Shirkuh and his men crossed the Kingdom of Jerusalem and entered Egypt. This intervention was a momentous event in the history of the Fatimid regime and Egypt: enfeebled by the constant civil wars, the country now became a prize in the contest between Damascus and Jerusalem, a process that would end with the abolition of the Fatimid Caliphate itself by Saladin in 1171.

Dirgham appealed to Amalric for help, but the King of Jerusalem was unable to intervene in time: in late April 1164, the Syrians surprised and defeated Dirgham's brother Mulham at Bilbays, opening the way to Cairo. On the news of the battle, a panic broke out in the capital of Egypt. Desperate for funds to pay his men, Dirgham confiscated the possessions of orphans, thereby provoking a public outcry against him. His troops began deserting him, including the entire Rayhaniyya corps. Left with only 500 horsemen, he appeared before the caliphal palace, but the caliph turned him away and advised him to save his life. More and more of his troops defected, until he was left with thirty men. He then fled Cairo, accompanied by the curses of the populace, while Shirkuh's army was entering the capital. He was overtaken near Fustat, however, dragged from his horse and killed (July/August 1154, other sources give the month as May/June), followed soon by his brothers. His head was severed and paraded in public, while his corpse was left unburied for several days, before being taken to a burial at Birkat al-Fil.

Shawar, restored to the vizierate, quickly fell out with Shirkuh, and a complicated series of conflicts between Shawar, Shirkuh, and Amalric followed until 1169, when Shawar was executed and replaced as vizier by Shirkuh. When the latter died three months later, he was succeeded by his nephew, Saladin.

== Sources ==
- al-Imad, Leila S. (1990). The Fatimid Vizierate (979-1172). Berlin: Klaus Schwarz Verlag. ISBN 3-922968-82-1.
- Brett, Michael (2017). The Fatimid Empire. Edinburgh: Edinburgh University Press. ISBN 978-0-7486-4076-8.
- Canard, Marius (1965). "Ḍirg̲h̲ām". In Lewis, B.; Pellat, Ch. & Schacht, J. (eds.). The Encyclopaedia of Islam, Second Edition. Volume II: C–G. Leiden: E. J. Brill. pp. 317–319. OCLC 495469475.
- Halm, Heinz (2014). Kalifen und Assassinen: Ägypten und der vordere Orient zur Zeit der ersten Kreuzzüge, 1074–1171 [Caliphs and Assassins: Egypt and the Near East at the Time of the First Crusades, 1074–1171] (in German). Munich: C. H. Beck. doi:10.17104/9783406661648-1. ISBN 978-3-406-66163-1.

Preceded by Shawar	Vizier of the Fatimid Caliphate; 31 August 1163 – May/August 1164	Succeeded by Shawar
