= Sahib al-bab =

The ṣāḥib al-bāb (Arabic: صاحب الباب, lit. 'master of the gate'), also known as the wazīr al-ṣaghīr (Arabic: وزير الصغير, lit. 'the lesser vizier'), was one of the most senior offices of the Fatimid Caliphate in the 12th century.

The post is first attested in the early years of the 12th century, during the vizierate of al-Afdal Shahanshah, when Husam al-Mulk Aftakin is mentioned as holding it. It effectively replaced the office of 'master of the curtain' (ṣāḥib al-sitr), which was usually held by a court eunuch of Slavic origin. Unlike the latter office, the ṣāḥib al-bāb was always held by a military officer, and was counted among the most senior rank of commanders (the 'commanders with a collar', al-umarāʾ al-mutawwaqūn). From the time of Abu'l-Muzaffar Khumurtash in c. 1141, the ṣāḥib al-bāb had the appellation al-muʿazzam ('the exalted, glorified').

Most of the information about the duties of the office comes from the historian, and one-time Fatimid official, Ibn al-Tuwayr. When the vizier was not of military origin, the ṣāḥib al-bāb was responsible for hearing the petitions and grievances (maẓālim) in the vizier's stead, taking up a seat at the Golden Gate, the entrance to the caliphal palace, for the purpose. When the vizier was a military commander, the ṣāḥib al-bāb took up a role as the vizier's deputy and chief assistant. He also shared with the army's commander-in-chief (isfahsālār or muqaddam al-ʿaskar) responsibility over military affairs.

As head chamberlain, the ṣāḥib al-bāb also had a prominent role in public ceremonies and palace receptions. For ceremonial matters he had a deputy, to whom the important role of leading envoys to their assigned places. He was usually drawn from the juridical or religious officials, and was addressed by the title of ʿadiyy al-mulk.

Described as a "second vizierate", the office ranked second after the vizier in the official hierarchy, and served as a springboard for the vizierate itself for three of its holders: Abu'l-Fath Yanis, Ridwan ibn Walakhshi and Dirgham. The office is translated by modern scholars as "high chamberlain" or "majordomo".

== Sources ==
- Bearman, P. J.; Bianquis, Th.; Bosworth, C. E.; van Donzel, E. & Heinrichs, W. P., eds. (2002). "al-Wazīr al-Ṣag̲h̲īr". The Encyclopaedia of Islam, Second Edition. Volume XI: W–Z. Leiden: E. J. Brill. p. 197. doi:10.1163/1573-3912_islam_SIM_7905. ISBN 978-90-04-12756-2.
- Brett, Michael (2017). The Fatimid Empire. The Edinburgh History of the Islamic Empires. Edinburgh: Edinburgh University Press. ISBN 978-0-7486-4076-8.
- Halm, Heinz (2014). Kalifen und Assassinen: Ägypten und der vordere Orient zur Zeit der ersten Kreuzzüge, 1074–1171 [Caliphs and Assassins: Egypt and the Near East at the Time of the First Crusades, 1074–1171] (in German). Munich: C.H. Beck. ISBN 978-3-406-66163-1.
- Sayyid, Ayman F. (1995). "Ṣāḥib al-Bāb". In Bosworth, C. E.; van Donzel, E.; Heinrichs, W. P. & Lecomte, G. (eds.). The Encyclopaedia of Islam, Second Edition. Volume VIII: Ned–Sam. Leiden: E. J. Brill. pp. 831–832. ISBN 978-90-04-09834-3.
