= Tala'i ibn Ruzzik =

Ruler and vizier of Fatimid Egypt (1154–1161)

Tala'i ibn Ruzzik طلائع ﺑﻦ ﺭﺯﻳﻚ

Ruler and Grand Vizier of the Fatimid Caliphate
- In office 1158–1161
- Preceded by: Abbas ibn Abi al-Futuh
- Succeeded by: Ruzzik ibn Tala'i

Personal details
- Died: 10 September 1161 Cairo
- Children: Ruzzik
- Occupation: Military commander, governor, vizier (active years before 1153 to 1161)

Tala'i ibn Ruzzik (Arabic: طلائع ﺑﻦ ﺭﺯﻳﻚ, romanized: Ṭalāʾīʿ ibn Ruzzīk, with his full titles and surnames Abū'l-Gharāt Fāris al-Muslimīn al-Malik al-Ṣāliḥ Ṭalāʾīʿ ibn Ruzzīk al-Ghassānī al-Armanī) was a military commander and official of the Fatimid Caliphate, serving as its vizier from 1154 until his assassination in 1161, when he was succeeded by his son, Ruzzik ibn Tala'i. He is generally acknowledged as the last of the powerful and capable viziers of the Fatimid state. During his tenure the Fatimid Caliphate regained a measure of stability, and was once again able to project its power abroad and pursue its political interests in the Eastern Mediterranean.

== Early life and career ==
Although his nisbah of al-Ghassānī implies an origin form the Arab tribe of the Ghassanids, most authors consider Tala'i ibn Ruzzik an Armenian (whence the surname al-Armanī), and indicate that his father was among those Armenians who came to Egypt under the rule of the powerful Armenian vizier Badr al-Jamali and his son al-Afdal Shahanshah. Indeed, some writers thought that he was born in Armenia. Born at the beginning of the 12th century, at first Ibn Ruzzik appears to have pursued a career in Iraq, where he also converted to Twelver Shi'ism, as evidenced by the correspondence he maintained thereafter with Mosul, Kufa, and Hillah.

At an unknown point, he joined the Fatimid army. His career there is unknown, but by 1143/4 he was governor of al-Buhayra, when he subdued a rebellion of the Lawata Berbers. Later he participated in the revolt of al-Adil ibn al-Sallar and his stepson Abbas ibn Abi al-Futuh against the vizier Ibn Masal (winter 1149/50), winning an important victory for the rebels. He then held the governorships of Aswan and of Qus (the capital of Upper Egypt). By 1154, he was governor of either Asyut in Upper Egypt, Ashmunayn and al-Bahnasa, or of Munyat Bani al-Khasib. In April of that year, Abbas ibn Abi al-Futuh and his son Nasr, who had already assassinated Ibn al-Sallar, murdered Caliph al-Zafir. Abbas placed the five-year-old al-Fa'iz on the throne and executed two of al-Zafir's brothers, whom he accused of responsibility for al-Zafir's assassination. Thereupon the women of the palace, led by al-Zafir's sister Sitt al-Qusur, reportedly cut off their hair and sent it to Ibn Ruzzik, requesting of him to save the dynasty. Ibn Ruzzik mobilized his forces—the holders of the iqṭāʿ fiefs and allied Arab and Berber tribes—and marched on Cairo, where Abbas' attempts to organize resistance foundered on popular opposition to his regime. As Ibn Ruzzik appeared before the city, Abbas, his son, and their chief supporters escaped the city towards Syria. Sitt al-Qusur sent word of their escape to the Crusaders of the Kingdom of Jerusalem, however, and Abbas was killed, while Nasr was taken captive and sent back to Egypt, where he was executed by the women of the palace. The treasure of the palace, however, which Abbas had loaded on a train of 600 mules and camels and taken with him, was kept by the Crusaders.

== Vizierate ==
=== Domestic policies ===
Thus, in July 1154, Ibn Ruzzik entered Cairo in triumph. The symbols he chose during his entry carried ominous overtones for the future of the Fatimid dynasty: eschewing Fatimid white, both the standards of his army, and Ibn Ruzzik's own clothes, were black, the colour of the Fatimids' arch-rivals, the Abbasids. He then installed himself in the Dar al-Ma'mun palace, and began a purge of the officials and their families who had collaborated with Abbas. Those found guilty were executed or sent to exile, while a few managed to escape to Yemen. This left Ibn Ruzzik, now vizier, as the undisputed ruler of the country; the underage Caliph al-Fa'iz was reduced to a mere figurehead and lived under virtual house arrest. He was the first Fatimid vizier to assume the honorific laqab of al-Malik ("king"); according to Thierry Bianquis, this was probably in imitation of the earlier Buyid dynasty, who were likewise Imamis and who exercised a similar role as the guardians of, and de facto rulers instead of, the Abbasid caliphs. However, it was also a title used by the other great contemporary Muslim ruler, Nur al-Din Zengi of Syria.

Himself well educated in high Arabic culture and a capable poet, Ibn Ruzzik liked to surround himself with scholars, among whom the most notable were the qāḍī al-Muhadhdhab al-Hasan ibn Ali ibn al-Zubayr (from Aswan), and the kātib al-Jalis al-Makin ibn al-Hubab, who directed the chancery (dīwān al-inshāʾ). Abbas' flight with the state treasure left a problematic financial situation, but Ibn Ruzzik proved an energetic and capable administrator, who paid close attention to financial matters: he not only balanced the economy, but also amassed a huge personal property through confiscations and speculation in cereals. Much of his personal wealth was used to endow pious establishments, including the large Husayn Mosque outside the Bab Zuwayla gate, intended to house a precious relic, the head of Husayn ibn Ali. This was the last major monument built under the Fatimids in Cairo, and was fortified according to the style of Upper Egypt.

Having served long in Upper Egypt, Ibn Ruzzik maintained close ties to it; upon becoming vizier, he financed the reconstruction of the main mosque at Qus. The area now became his main powerbase: a wealthy region which controlled access to the interior of the African continent, as well as the commerce routes linking Egypt with Arabia—including the symbolically important hajj routes and the wheat supply for Mecca and Medina— and the Indian Ocean. The support of the governor of Qus, Nasir al-Dawla Yaqut, was important in suppressing the rebellion of the governor of Damietta, al-Ahwad ibn Tamim in 1156, but Yaqut himself plotted an uprising in 1157, in consultation with one of the Caliphs aunts, who resented Ibn Ruzzik's interference in palace affairs. Yaqut was arrested in Cairo and replaced with Izz al-Din Tarkhan, followed by Shawar, one of Ibn Ruzzik's pages (and future vizier).

=== Conflict with the Crusaders ===
Political map of the Levant in c. 1165

In spring 1154, a Crusader fleet from the Kingdom of Sicily raided the port city of Tinnis with devastating effect. Newly come to power in Cairo, Ibn Ruzzik initially sought to placate the Crusaders by paying them tribute in exchange for a truce. To this end, he planned to raise new taxes on the iqṭāʿ fiefs of his officers. The latter were opposed to the idea, and instead launched a raid of their own against the Crusader port of Tyre. The operation, bold and unorthodox, was successful, and scuppered Ibn Ruzzik's plans.

In April 1154, Nur al-Din Zengi, the Muslim ruler of northern Syria, succeeded in capturing Damascus. Encouraged by this event, Ibn Ruzzik abandoned his negotiations with the Crusaders and renewed efforts to form a league between Egypt and Nur al-Din, which had already been attempted by Ibn al-Sallar in 1150. In 1158, Ibn Ruzzik sent the ḥādjib Mahmud al-Muwallad to Nur al-Din, proposing an alliance and joint operations against the Crusader principalities, while an army under Dirgham, the deputy chamberlain of the palace (nāʾib al-Bāb), was dispatched to raid into Palestine. The army scored some successes at Gaza and raided in Palestine up to beyond the Jordan River, while the Fatimid fleet raided against Beirut. These victories emboldened Ibn Ruzzik, who wrote of them to Nur al-Din, exhorting him to join with Egypt in holy war against the Crusaders. He also tried to enlist Usama ibn Munqidh, a former Fatimid official who had gained Nur al-Din's favour, in support of this cause, but in vain: Usama refused to take sides, and al-Muwallad's embassy failed.

These operations were judged as ineffective both by Arab chroniclers and modern historians, while the reasons behind Nur al-Din's passivity have been debated. Nevertheless, these operations forced the other powers of the eastern Mediterranean to once again take account of Fatimid power. In the aftermath of the raid, a mission from the Byzantine Empire arrived at Cairo, asking for assistance against the Kingdom of Sicily. In reply, the brother of the ruler of Cyprus, who had been taken prisoner, was sent to the Byzantine emperor Manuel I Komnenos. Soon after, envoys from the Crusader realms arrived to arrange a truce, while the Byzantines restored their relations with Nur al-Din. At the same time, Ibn Ruzzik tok care to fortify the city of Bilbays, north of Cairo, to block any army invading the country from the north.

== Death and succession ==
On 23 July 1160, Caliph al-Fa'iz died of illness. Ibn Ruzzik at first considered raising an adult member of the Fatimid clan to the caliphate, but in the end settled on the nine-year-old al-Adid, whose father was one of the brothers of al-Zafir executed by Abbas on the very day al-Fa'iz had been raised to the throne. With a minor once again on the throne, Ibn Ruzzik's position was secure, and was strengthened further when he forced the young caliph to marry his daughter.

However, these moves, coupled with Ibn Ruzzik's patronage of Twelver Shi'ism, alarmed the royal family. Sitt al-Qusur paid black soldiers, who attacked Ibn Ruzzik on 10 September 1161 in the hallway of his palace. Mortally wounded, Ibn Ruzzik nevertheless survived long enough to secure from the Caliph the recognition of his son, Ruzzik ibn Tala'i, as his successor, as well as the death of Sitt al-Qusur and the three men who had attacked him. On his deathbed, he reportedly confided to his son his three regrets: the construction of the Husayn Mosque outside the walls, which could be used to attack Cairo; that he did not have the opportunity to use Bilbays as a base against the Crusaders, despite the expenses lavished on it; and having put Shawar ibn Mujir al-Sa'di in the powerful position of governor of Upper Egypt, from where he now posed a threat to his own power. His premonition proved true: in 1162, Shawar chased Ibn Tala'i from Cairo, and became the de facto ruler of Egypt. In 1174, one of his descendants took part in an abortive large-scale conspiracy to overthrow Saladin and restore the Fatimids, who had been deposed three years previously, to power.

== Assessment ==
Muslim chroniclers were divided in their assessment of Ibn Ruzzik: the Egyptian historian Ibn Zafir focused on his violent behaviour and greed, but the 13th-century polymath Ibn Sa'id al-Maghribi considered him among the most successful Fatimid viziers, along the likes of Ibn Killis or al-Afdal Shahanshah. This assessment is largely shared by modern historians; Thierry Bianquis describes him as "the last great man of the Fāṭimid state, who wanted to reconstruct a strong Egypt, which could carry out its own foreign policies".

== Sources ==
- Bianquis, Thierry (2000). "Ṭalāʾiʿ b. Ruzzīk". In Bearman, P. J.; Bianquis, Th.; Bosworth, C. E.; van Donzel, E. & Heinrichs, W. P. (eds.). The Encyclopaedia of Islam, Second Edition. Volume X: T–U. Leiden: E. J. Brill. pp. 149–151. doi:10.1163/1573-3912_islam_SIM_7356. ISBN 978-90-04-11211-7.
- Brett, Michael (2007). "The Fatimids and the Counter-Crusade, 1099–1171". In Vermeulen, Urbain; D'Hulster, K. (eds.). Egypt and Syria in the Fāṭimid, Ayyūbid and Mamlūk Eras: Proceedings of the 11th, 12th and 13th International Colloquium organised at the Katholieke Universiteit in Leuven in May 2002, 2003 and 2004. Leuven. pp. 15–26.
- Daftary, Farhad (1990). The Ismāʿı̄lı̄s: Their History and Doctrines (First ed.). Cambridge: Cambridge University Press. ISBN 978-0-521-37019-6.
- Lev, Yaacov (1991). State and Society in Fatimid Egypt. Leiden: Brill. ISBN 9789004093447.
- Sanders, Paula A. (1998). "The Fatimid State, 969–1171". In Petry, Carl F. (ed.). The Cambridge History of Egypt: Islamic Egypt, 640–1517. Vol. 1. Cambridge: Cambridge University Press. pp. 151–174. ISBN 0-521-47137-0.

Preceded by Abbas ibn Abi al-Futuh	Vizier of the Fatimid Caliphate; 1154–1161	Succeeded by Ruzzik ibn Tala'i
