= Sitt al-Qusur =

12th-century Fatimid princess

Sitt al-Qusur ست القصور
- Born: Cairo, Egypt
- Died: 1161; Cairo, Egypt
Names
- Sitt al-Qusur bint Abd al-Majid al-Hafiz
- House: Fatimid
- Father: al-Hafiz
- Religion: Ismaili Shia

Sitt al-Qusur (Arabic: ست القصور, lit. 'Lady of the Palaces'; died 1161) was a Fatimid princess, the daughter of Caliph al-Hafiz and the sister of Caliph al-Zafir.

Sitt al-Qusur was a younger daughter of the eleventh Fatimid caliph, al-Hafiz (r. 1132–1149), and thus sister of al-Zafir (r. 1149–1154). Al-Zafir was assassinated in April 1154 by the vizier, Abbas ibn Abi al-Futuh, and his son, Nasr. The murder was followed by the installation of al-Zafir's five-year-old son, al-Fa'iz, as caliph, and the execution of two of al-Zafir's brothers, Yusuf and Jibril, whom Abbas accused of the caliph's assassination.

Sitt al-Qusur immediately sought revenge against the vizier, and contacted even the Crusader Kingdom of Jerusalem for help in overthrowing him. Closer to Cairo, the Fatimid princesses are said to have cut their hair and sent it in token of supplication to the governor of Asyut, Tala'i ibn Ruzzik. Ibn Ruzzik readily agreed and marched on Cairo. In the unrest that followed, Abbas and his son tried to flee to Syria, but they were intercepted by the Crusaders near the Dead Sea. Sitt al-Qusur paid a large amount to have both of them killed; Nasr was reportedly mutilated and killed by being beaten to death by the palace women with their clogs. Sitt al-Qusur then took over the tutelage of al-Fa'iz, although real power rested with Ibn Ruzzik as the new vizier.

In July 1160, al-Fa'iz died of an epileptic seizure. As his successor, Ibn Ruzzik chose the youngest of all Fatimid princes, the nine-year-old al-Adid (r. 1160–1171), whose father Yusuf was one of the brothers of al-Zafir executed by Abbas on the very day al-Fa'iz had been raised to the throne. With a minor once again on the throne, Ibn Ruzzik's position was secured, and was strengthened further when he forced the young caliph to marry his daughter.

However, these moves alarmed Sitt al-Qusur, who in September 1161 allied with the palace majordomo, palace eunuchs, and commanders of the Black African troops to kill Ibn Ruzzik in the corridor leading to the caliph's audience chamber. In the event, the attack was badly executed. Both Ibn Ruzzik and his son, Ruzzik ibn Tala'i, were wounded, but not killed, giving time to for his guard to extricate them to the vizierial palace and kill many of their assailants. In retaliation, Ruzzik had Sitt al-Qusur brought before him and strangled her with her own veil. When his father died shortly after, he succeeded him as vizier.

== See also ==
- Fatimid dynasty

== Sources ==
- Brett, Michael (2017). The Fatimid Empire. The Edinburgh History of the Islamic Empires. Edinburgh: Edinburgh University Press. ISBN 978-0-7486-4076-8.
- Cortese, Delia; Calderini, Simonetta (2006). Women and the Fatimids in the World of Islam. Edinburgh: Edinburgh University Press. ISBN 0-7486-1733-7.
- Halm, Heinz (2014). Kalifen und Assassinen: Ägypten und der vordere Orient zur Zeit der ersten Kreuzzüge, 1074–1171 [Caliphs and Assassins: Egypt and the Near East at the Time of the First Crusades, 1074–1171] (in German). Munich: C.H. Beck. ISBN 978-3-406-66163-1.
