= Ispahsalar =

Military title historically used in the Islamic world

Ispahsālār (Persian: اسپهسالار) or sipahsālār (سپهسالار; lit. 'army commander'), in Arabic rendered as isfahsalār (إسفهسلار) or iṣbahsalār (إصبهسلار), was a title used in much of the Islamic world during the 10th–15th centuries, to denote the senior-most military commanders, but also as a generic general officer rank.

== Islamic East and Persia ==
The title derives from Middle Persian spāh-sālār (𐬯𐬞𐬁𐬵⸱𐬯𐬁𐬮𐬁𐬭), already attested in Pazend texts of the 9th century. It was the equivalent of the old Sasanian title of spahbed (New Persian ispahbadh), which during the Islamic era fell out of general use and became a regnal title among certain local dynasties in Tabaristan and Khurasan. The titles of ispahsalar and sipahsalar came into prominence in the Islamic world in the later 10th century, with the rise to power of Iranian dynasties during the so-called "Iranian Intermezzo". In its sense of 'commander-in-chief', the title was used in parallel to the usual Arabic titles hajib al-hujjab (حاجب الحجاب), hajib al-kabir (حاجب الكبير) or sahib al-jaysh (صاحب الجيش).

Among the Buyids, it was given as a sign of conciliation as well as of particular honour to two rebellious Turkish generals, Sebüktigin al-Mu'izzi in 971, and, after his death, Alptakin in 974/5. With the growing instability of the Buyid states towards the end of the century, the usage of ispahsalar became debased, and it came to mean simply 'commander' or just 'officer'. Among the later Saffarid dynasty under Khalaf ibn Ahmad (r. 963–1002), the title was applied to the commander-in-chief of the army, while the hajib al-hujjab was a separate office, possibly commanding the slave troops (mamalik or ghilman). Among the Turkic dynasties, the Arabic and Persian titles were supplemented by the Turkish title sübashi. The Ghaznavids employed sipahsalar and its Arabic equivalents in its original sense of "commander-in-chief", but also for commanders of specific contingents of their army, alongside the use of "plain" salar (and in Arabic, hajib) for less exalted generals. The Seljuq Empire and the Sultanate of Rum used a number of variants of the title, such as ispahsalar-i buzurg (اسپهسالار بزرگ) or amir-i ispahsalar (امیر اسپهسالار), as well as a variety of other Arabic, Persian and Turkish titles both in a technical sense for the commander-in-chief of the army as well as the governors and army commanders of important regions, as well as in a more general sense of "general officer". The title was also used by the Khwarizmshahs, originally Seljuq vassals, who employed a unique variant, qir isfahsalar (قیر اسفهسالار), for commanders of frontier regions.

The Mongol conquests diminished the use of the title, bringing to the fore Turkish and Mongol ones instead, but it remained in widespread use in the isolated and conservative regions of Gilan and Daylam on the Caspian shore. In Persia proper, it was revived by the Safavids under Shah Abbas I (r. 1587–1629), replacing the Arabic title amir al-umara, used until then. The office was apparently usually held by the beglerbegi of Azerbaijan, with Rustam Khan the most prominent person to occupy it. The post was abolished again in 1664/77, after which a commander-in-chief (sardar) was appointed only in wartime. The title re-appeared in the form sipahsalar i-a'zam (سپهسالار اعظم) under the late Qajar dynasty, being held as an honorific by Minister of War Mirza Mohammad Khan Sepahsalar in 1858, the reformist Minister of War (and soon after chief minister) Mirza Hosein Khan Sepahsalar—who also built the namesake Sepahsalar Mosque in Tehran—in 1871, and by chief minister Mohammad Vali Khan Tonekaboni in 1910.

== Use in the Caucasus and the Mashriq ==
Buyid, and especially Seljuq influence, led to the spread of Ispahsalar, alongside other Persian titles, westwards to the Mashriq and even the Christian countries of the Caucasus: in Armenian it became [a]spasalar, and in Georgian Amirspasalari, one of the four great ministers of state of the Georgian realm. The title was also in common use among the Turkic Atabeg dynasties of Syria and Iraq and later the Ayyubids, both for regional military commanders but also, uniquely, as one of the personal titles of the Atabegs themselves.

In Fatimid Egypt, the Isfahsalar was the commander-in-chief of the army and jointly responsible with the Head Chamberlain (Ṣāhib al-Bāb, صاحب الباب or Wazīr al-Ṣaghīr, Arabic: وزير الصغير) for military organization. The title survived among the Mamluks of Egypt, where both Isfahsalar and the nisba "al-Isfahsalārī" (الإسفهسلاري) were commonly used in the titulature of the senior commanders in the 13th century, but it seems to have been debased and fallen out of use thereafter. It is still attested as late as 1475 for a Mamluk commander-in-chief, but by this time the term isbahsalar was also applied generally to the guards of the Mamluk sultan. Among the Ottomans, sipāhsālār (سپاهسالار) continued to be used but in a generic sense, the usual terms for commander-in-chief being serdār (سردار) and serasker (سرعسكر).

== Islamic South Asia ==
From the Ghaznavids, the title also passed to the Ghurid dynasty, rulers of Afghanistan, Pakistan, and northern India. Under the Ghurids, Isfahsalar signified the commander-in-chief, but in the 13th century it denoted an officer in command of 100 cavalry, and under the Tughluqids it declined to signify the commander of ten men. Aside from this technical meaning, the term continued to be used in the Muslim states of India in the 14th–15th centuries as a generic term for "general officer", e.g. under the Lodi dynasty, or as "commander-in-chief", e.g. in the Bengal Sultanate or the Deccan sultanates. Under the Mughals, it was a title sometimes given to the Khankhanan ("Khan of Khans"), the Mughal commander-in-chief, especially when he led the army in place of the Mughal emperor.

== See also ==
- Amirspasalar

== Sources ==
- Bosworth, C. E. & Digby, S. (1978). "Ispahsālār, Sipahsālār". In van Donzel, E.; Lewis, B.; Pellat, Ch. & Bosworth, C. E. (eds.). The Encyclopaedia of Islam, Second Edition. Volume IV: Iran–Kha. Leiden: E. J. Brill. pp. 208–210. OCLC 758278456.
- Katouzian, Homa (2006). State and Society in Iran: The Eclipse of the Qajars and the Emergence of the Pahlavis. I.B.Tauris. ISBN 1845112725.
