= Siege of Alexandria (1167) =

Siege in Egypt during the Crusades

Coordinates: 31°11′51″N 29°53′33″E

- Part of the Crusader invasions of Egypt
Date	Summer 1167
Location	Alexandria, Egypt
Result	Negotiated settlement

Belligerents
Kingdom of Jerusalem; Fatimid Caliphate (vizierate)	Zengids of Syria; Fatimid Caliphate(Caliphate)

Commanders and leaders
Amalric I of Jerusalem; Shawar	Shirkuh; Saladin; Al-Adid

The siege of Alexandria took place in summer 1167, during the third Crusader invasion of Egypt, when the Crusaders of the Kingdom of Jerusalem besieged the port city of Alexandria, nominally part of the Fatimid Caliphate but held by Saladin on behalf of his uncle, Shirkuh. Despite the small number of troops he had with him and the dubious support of the Alexandrians, Saladin managed to sustain the siege for three months, until food started running out. At that point Shirkuh arranged for a negotiated settlement, which saw Alexandria handed over to the Fatimid vizier Shawar, and both the Crusaders and Shirkuh's Zengid troops departed Egypt after the payment of tribute from the Fatimid treasury.

== Sources ==
- Ehrenkreutz, Andrew S. (1972). Saladin. Albany, NY: State University of New York Press. ISBN 0-87395-095-X.
- Fulton, Michael S. (2022). Contest for Egypt: The Collapse of the Fatimid Caliphate, the Ebb of Crusader Influence, and the Rise of Saladin. Leiden and Boston: Brill. ISBN 978-90-04-51227-6.
- Halm, Heinz (2014). Kalifen und Assassinen: Ägypten und der vordere Orient zur Zeit der ersten Kreuzzüge, 1074–1171 [Caliphs and Assassins: Egypt and the Near East at the Time of the First Crusades, 1074–1171] (in German). Munich: C. H. Beck. doi:10.17104/9783406661648-1. ISBN 978-3-406-66163-1.
- Lev, Yaacov (1999). Saladin in Egypt. Leiden, Boston, Köln: Brill. ISBN 90-04-11221-9.
- Lyons, Malcolm Cameron; Jackson, D. E. P. (1982). Saladin: The Politics of the Holy War. Cambridge: Cambridge University Press. ISBN 0-521-31739-8.
- Omran, Mahmud Said (1985). "King Amalric and the Siege of Alexandria, 1167". In Peter W. Edbury (ed.). Crusade and Settlement. Papers read at the First Conference of the Society for the Study of the Crusades and the Latin East and presented to R. C. Smail. Cardiff: University College Cardiff Press. pp. 191–196. ISBN 0-906449-78-2.
