= Shirkuh =

Ayyubid statesman (died 1169)

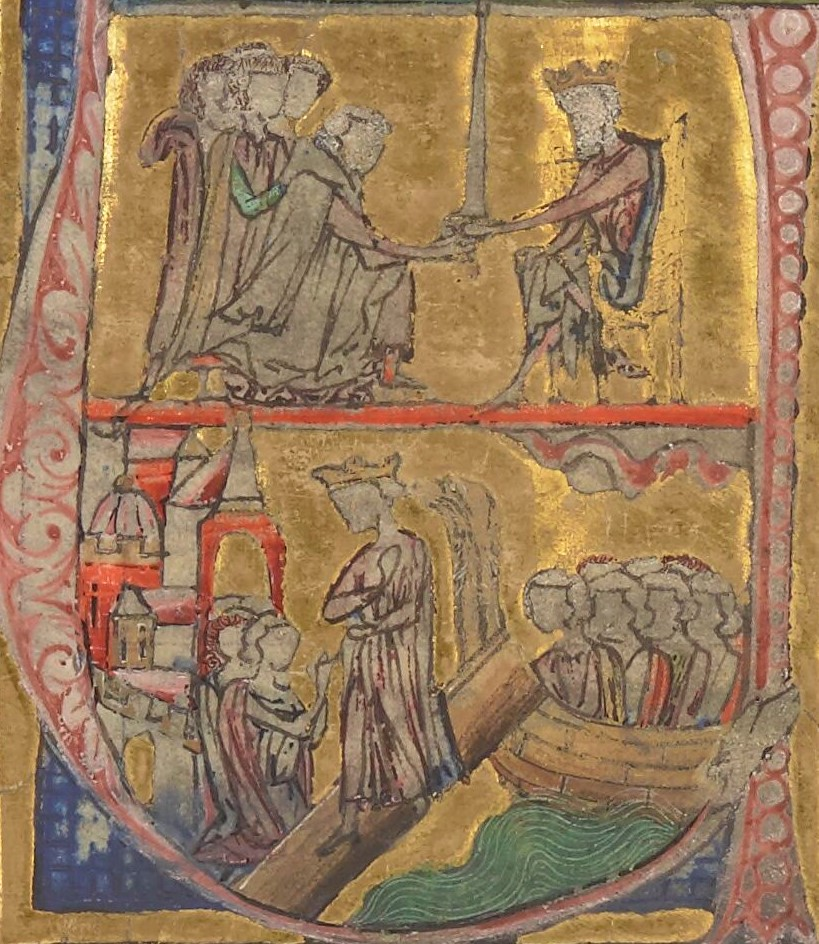
- 13th century European depiction of Adîd abû Muhammad and Shîrkûh (upper panel), with the arrival of Amalric at Constantinople (lower panel)

Vizier of the Fatimid Caliphate
- Reign: 18 January – 23 March 1169
- Predecessor: Shawar
- Successor: Saladin (Vizier)
- Born: Dvin, Armenia
Names
- Asad ad-Dīn Shirkuh ibn Shadhī
- Father: Shadhi ibn Marwan (Kurdish Chief)
- Religion: Sunni Islam

Asad al-Dīn Shīrkūh bin Shādhī (Arabic: أسد الدين شيركوه بن شاذي, romanized: ʾasad al-Dīn Šērkōh bin Šāḏī; Kurdish: ئەسەدەدین شێرکۆ، شێرگوێ, romanized: Esed El-Dîn Şêrko, Şêrgûh), (died 23 March 1169) was a Kurdish commander in service of the Zengid dynasty, then the Fatimid Caliphate and uncle of Saladin. His military and diplomatic efforts in Egypt were a key factor in establishing the Ayyubid dynasty in that country.

== Name ==
The pronunciation and the meaning of Shirkuh is not quite clear: it could mean “the mountain lion” or possibly Shirguh (Sher-gue) in Kurdish “having the lion’s ear".

His Arabic honorific Asad ad-Din similarly means "the lion of faith". In Latin, his name was rendered as "Siraconus"; William of Tyre, referring to the expedition of 1163, describes him as:

an able and energetic warrior, eager for glory and of wide experience in military affairs. Generous far beyond the resources of his patrimony, Shirkuh was beloved by his followers because of this munificence. He was small of stature, very stout and fat and already advanced in years. Though of lowly origin, he had become rich and risen by merit from his humble estate to the rank of prince. He was afflicted with cataract in one eye. He was a man of great endurance under hardships, one who bore hunger and thirst with an equanimity quite unusual for that time of life.

== Origins and earlier career ==
He was originally from a Kurdish village in Armenia near the city of Dvin. He was the son of Shadhi ibn Marwan, a Kurdish chief, and the brother of Najm ad-Din Ayyub, the ancestor of the Ayyubid dynasty. The family was closely connected to the Shaddadid dynasty, and when the last Shaddadid was deposed in Dvin in 1130, Shahdi moved the family first to Baghdad and then to Tikrit, where he was appointed governor by the regional administrator Bihruz. Ayyub succeeded his father as governor of Tikrit when Shahdi died soon after. When Shirkuh killed a man who was a Christian in some versions of the story, and with whom he was quarrelling in Tikrit in 1138, alternatively, Shirkuh might have killed that man due to insulting or sexual assault on a young woman, the brothers were exiled (Shirkuh's nephew Yusuf, later known as Saladin, was supposedly born the night they left). They joined Nur ad-Din Zengi's army, and Shirkuh served under Nur ad-Din Zengi who succeeded Zengi in Mosul. Shirkuh was later given Homs, ar-Rahba and other appanages by Nur ad Din Zengi as his vassal. Ayyub served as governor of Baalbek and later Damascus, and the two brothers negotiated the surrender of Damascus to Nur ad-Din in 1154.

In 1163, Nur ad-Din was asked by Shawar to intervene in Egypt in a dispute between him and Dirgham over the Fatimid vizierate. Nur ad-Din sent Shirkuh, and this was to be the first of three ventures Shirkuh made into Egypt. These nominally on Nur ad-Din's behalf, who gave him a grant of 200,000 dinars and allowed Shirkuh to select 2,000 soldiers from his regiments (aksar) with campaign materiel and another special grant of 20 dinars for each soldier. He also had 8,000 horsemen, including 500 mamluks and Kurds, from his own regiment from his appanage of Homs. Shirkuh used his grant to hire 6,000 Turkmen cavalry, commanded by Aineddawla Yaruqi.

On this first occasion, his nephew Saladin accompanied him as an advisor. Shawar was restored and Dirgham was killed, but after quarrelling with Shirkuh, Shawar allied with Amalric I of Jerusalem, who marched into Egypt in 1164 and besieged Shirkuh at Bilbeis (see Crusader invasion of Egypt). In response Nur ad-Din attacked the Crusader states and almost captured the Principality of Antioch.

== Later career ==
Shirkuh was invited back into Egypt by the Fatimid Caliph Al-Adid in 1167, to help defeat the Crusaders who were attacking Cairo. Shawar once again allied with Amalric, who besieged Shirkuh in Alexandria until he agreed to leave; however, a Crusader garrison remained in Egypt and Amalric allied with the Byzantine Empire, planning to conquer it entirely. To destroy the garrison, Shawar switched alliances, from Amalric to Shirkuh. The Muslims fought a pitched battle with the Crusaders, who did not have the resources to conquer Egypt and were forced to retreat.

Shirkuh and his associates enjoyed widespread support among the civil elite In Egypt for religious reasons. Although the Fatimid rulers were Shiite, the majority of people remained Sunni Muslims. In January 1169 Shirkuh entered Cairo and had the untrustworthy Shawar executed. When he reached Cairo with his armies he was welcomed by the Fatimid Caliph Al-Adid and treated with great honour. He accepted the office of vizier, but died two months later on 22 March; as Baha ad-Din ibn Shaddad describes, "it was the case that Asad ad-Din was a great eater, excessively given to partaking of rich meats. He suffered many bouts of indigestion and from quinsy, from which he would recover after putting up with great discomfort. He was taken severely ill, afflicted with a serious quinsy, which killed him on 22 Jumada II 564 [23 March 1169]."

== Legacy ==
He was succeeded as vizier by his nephew Saladin, who had served with him on his campaigns in Egypt. From 1174, Saladin eventually succeeded Nur ad-Din as well, uniting Egypt and Syria, which enabled him to almost completely drive out the crusaders from Syria and Palestine. A number of historians have offered the view that Shirkuh's death was an important factor in allowing Saladin to consolidate his position as Sultan and as undisputed head of the Ayyubid family.

Although Nur ad-Din Zengi took back the domain of Homs on Shirkuh's death, in 1179 Saladin gave Homs to Shirkuh's son Muhammad ibn Shirkuh and his descendants continued to rule in Homs thereafter until the death in 1263 of his last descendant the emir, Al-Ashraf Musa, Emir of Homs. After this Homs was ruled directly as part of the Mamluk Empire.

== Sources ==
- Baha ad-Din ibn Shaddad, The Rare and Excellent History of Saladin, ed. D. S. Richards, Ashgate, 2002.
- Halm, Heinz (2014). Kalifen und Assassinen: Ägypten und der vordere Orient zur Zeit der ersten Kreuzzüge, 1074–1171 [Caliphs and Assassins: Egypt and the Near East at the Time of the First Crusades, 1074–1171] (in German). Munich: C.H. Beck. ISBN 978-3-406-66163-1.
- William of Tyre, A History of Deeds Done Beyond the Sea, trans. E.A. Babcock and A.C. Krey. Columbia University Press, 1943.
- Steven Runciman, A History of the Crusades, vol. II: The Kingdom of Jerusalem. Cambridge University Press, 1952.
- Minorsky, Vladimir (1953). Studies in Caucasian History. New York: Taylor’s Foreign Press. ISBN 0-521-05735-3.
- Lyons, Malcolm Cameron; Jackson, D. E. P. (1982). Saladin: The Politics of the Holy War. Cambridge: Cambridge University Press. ISBN 0-521-31739-8.

Preceded by Shawar	Vizier of the Fatimid Caliphate; 18 January – 23 March 1169	Succeeded by Saladin
