= Ruzzik ibn Tala'i =

Fatimid vizier from 1161 to 1163

Abū Shujāʿ Ruzzik ibn Tala'i

Ruler and Grand Vizier of the Fatimid Caliphate
- In office 1158–1161
- Preceded by: Tala'i ibn Ruzzik
- Succeeded by: Shawar

Personal details
- Parent: Tala'i ibn Ruzzik

Abū Shujāʿ Ruzzīk ibn Ṭalāʾiʿ was the son of the Twelver Shi'a Armenian vizier of the Fatimid Caliphate, Tala'i ibn Ruzzik, and succeeded his father when the latter was assassinated in September 1161. He was himself overthrown by the military commander; Shawar in early 1163 and executed in August 1163.

== Sources ==
- al-Imad, Leila S. (1990). The Fatimid Vizierate (979-1172). Berlin: Klaus Schwarz Verlag. ISBN 3-922968-82-1.
- Bianquis, Thierry (1995). "Ruzzīk b. Ṭalāʾiʿ". In Bosworth, C. E.; van Donzel, E.; Heinrichs, W. P. & Lecomte, G. (eds.). The Encyclopaedia of Islam, Second Edition. Volume VIII: Ned–Sam. Leiden: E. J. Brill. pp. 653–654. doi:10.1163/1573-3912_islam_SIM_6358. ISBN 978-90-04-09834-3.
- Brett, Michael (2017). The Fatimid Empire. The Edinburgh History of the Islamic Empires. Edinburgh: Edinburgh University Press. ISBN 978-0-7486-4076-8.
- Halm, Heinz (2014). Kalifen und Assassinen: Ägypten und der vordere Orient zur Zeit der ersten Kreuzzüge, 1074–1171 [Caliphs and Assassins: Egypt and the Near East at the Time of the First Crusades, 1074–1171] (in German). Munich: C.H. Beck. ISBN 978-3-406-66163-1.

Preceded by Tala'i ibn Ruzzik	Vizier of the Fatimid Caliphate; September 1161 – January 1163	Succeeded by Shawar
