= Bilbeis =

City in Egypt

Bilbeis بلبيس
- City
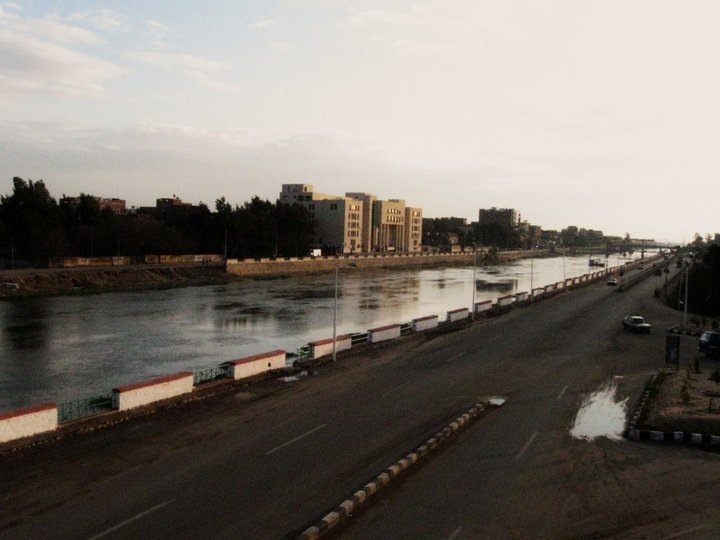
- Nickname: Eastern gate of Egypt
- Location within Egypt
- Coordinates: 30°25′18″N 31°33′33″E
- Country: Egypt
- Governorate: Sharqia Governorate

Area
  - Total: 337.0 km^{2} (130.1 sq mi)
- Elevation: 12 m (39 ft)

Population (2023)
  - Total: 895,017
  - Density: 2,656/km^{2} (6,879/sq mi)
- Time zone: UTC+2 (EET)
  - Summer (DST): UTC+3 (EEST)

Bilbeis (Arabic: بلبيس pronounced [belˈbeːs]; Bohairic Coptic: Ⲫⲉⲗⲃⲉⲥ/Ⲫⲉⲗⲃⲏⲥ P^{h}elbes/P^{h}elbēs) is an ancient fortress city on the eastern edge of the southern Nile Delta in Egypt, the site of the ancient city and former bishopric of Phelbes and a Latin Catholic titular see. It is located 20 km from the city of 10th of Ramadan and roughly 50 km from the city of Cairo.

The city is small in size but densely populated, with over 407,300 residents. It also houses the Egyptian Air Force Academy complex, which contains the town's largest public school in Al-Zafer.

Coptic tradition says that Bilbeis was one of the stopping places of the Holy Family during the Flight into Egypt.

== History ==
The city was important enough in the Roman province of Augustamnica Secunda to become a bishopric.

Situated on a caravan and natural invasion route from the east, Bilbeis was conquered in 640 by the Arabs. Amr ibn al-As besieged and took the city defended by a Byzantine general called al-Ardubun. According to a Muslim legend, Armanusa, the daughter of Muqawqis lived in Bilbeis. In 727 some of the Qays tribe were resettled here and later chain of fortresses was built to protect Cairo.

The city played a role in the machinations for control of the Fatimid vizierate: first in 1164, when Shirkuh was besieged in the city by the combined forces of Shawar and crusader Amalric, King of Jerusalem for three months; then again in 1168 when the city was assaulted again by Amalric's army, who took the city after three days on 4 November and indiscriminately killed the inhabitants. (See Crusader invasion of Egypt.)

Benjamin of Tudela reported that Bilbeis had 200 Jews in 1170.

In 1798, its fortifications were rebuilt at the order of Napoleon.

Bilbays Air Base, an Egyptian Air Force base is nearby.

== Places of worship ==
=== Mosques ===
- Sadat Quraish Mosque, one of Egypt’s earliest mosques, built in 640.
- Amir al-Gish Mosque
- The Great Mosque in Kesaria

=== Churches ===
- Coptic church of St. George

== Ecclesiastical history ==
The bishopric, a suffragan of the Metropolitan of provincial capital Leontopolis, faded.

=== Titular see ===
The diocese of Phelbes was nominally restored in 1933 as a Latin Catholic titular bishopric.

It has had the following incumbents, all of the lowest (episcopal) rank:

- Enrico van Schingen, Jesuits (S.J.) (1936-12-17 – 1954-07-02)
- Antoine Henri van den Hurk, Capuchin Franciscans (O.F.M. Cap.) (1955-01-01 – 1961-01-03) as Apostolic Vicar of Medan (Indonesia) (1955-01-01 – 1961-01-03), promoted first Metropolitan Archbishop of Medan (1961-01-03 – 1976-05-24)
- Walmor Battú Wichrowski (1961-05-31 – 1971-05-27) & (1972-11-16 – 2001-10-31)
- Airton José dos Santos (2001-12-19 – 2004-08-04) as Auxiliary Bishop of Santo André (Brazil) (2001-12-19 – 2004-08-04), later Bishop of Mogi das Cruzes (Brazil) (2004-08-04 – 2012-02-15), Metropolitan Archbishop of Campinas (Brazil) (2012-02-15 – ... )
- Javier Augusto del Río Alba (2004-10-12 – 2006-07-11) as Auxiliary Bishop of Callao (Peru) (2004-10-12 – 2006-07-11), Coadjutor Archbishop of Arequipa (Peru) (2006-07-11 – 2006-10-20), succeeding as Metropolitan Archbishop of Arequipa (2006-10-20 – ... ), Second Vice-president of Episcopal Conference of Peru (January 2012 – ... )
- Janusz Wiesław Kaleta (2006-09-15 – 2011-02-05)
- Daniel Fernando Sturla Berhouet, Salesians (S.D.B.) (2011-12-10 – 2014-02-11) as Auxiliary Bishop of Montevideo (Uruguay) (2011-12-10 – 2014-02-11), succeeded as Metropolitan Archbishop of Montevideo (2014-02-11 – ... ), created Cardinal-Priest of S. Galla (2015-02-14 [2015-05-17] – ... )
- Jorge Ángel Saldía Pedraza, Dominican Order (O.P.) (2014-03-25 – ... ), Auxiliary Bishop of La Paz (Bolivia)

== Climate ==
Bilbeis is classified by Köppen-Geiger climate classification system as hot desert (BWh), as the rest of Egypt.

Climate data for Bilbeis
Month	Jan	Feb	Mar	Apr	May	Jun	Jul	Aug	Sep	Oct	Nov	Dec	Year
Mean daily maximum °C (°F)	18.7 (65.7)	20 (68)	23.7 (74.7)	27.9 (82.2)	31.7 (89.1)	34.5 (94.1)	34.2 (93.6)	34.1 (93.4)	31.8 (89.2)	30.1 (86.2)	25.3 (77.5)	21 (70)	27.8 (82.0)
Daily mean °C (°F)	13.1 (55.6)	13.8 (56.8)	16.8 (62.2)	20.2 (68.4)	23.9 (75.0)	27 (81)	27.5 (81.5)	27.6 (81.7)	25.3 (77.5)	23.4 (74.1)	19.8 (67.6)	15.1 (59.2)	21.1 (70.1)
Mean daily minimum °C (°F)	7.5 (45.5)	7.7 (45.9)	10 (50)	12.6 (54.7)	16.1 (61.0)	19.5 (67.1)	20.9 (69.6)	21.2 (70.2)	18.9 (66.0)	16.8 (62.2)	14.3 (57.7)	9.2 (48.6)	14.6 (58.2)
Average precipitation mm (inches)	7 (0.3)	3 (0.1)	3 (0.1)	1 (0.0)	1 (0.0)	0 (0)	0 (0)	0 (0)	0 (0)	2 (0.1)	4 (0.2)	4 (0.2)	25 (1)
Source: Climate-Data.org

== See also ==
- List of cities in Egypt

== Sources ==
- Gibb, Sir Hamilton (2006). The Life of Saladin. Oxford University Press. ISBN 978-0-86356-928-9.
