= Pro-Fatimid conspiracy against Saladin =

1173–1174 conspiracy in Cairo, Egypt

In 1173–1174, a conspiracy took place in Cairo in favour of restoring the Isma'ili Shi'a Fatimid Caliphate, which had been abolished in 1171 by Saladin, the first Ayyubid ruler of Egypt. The conspiracy, which is known only from sources favourable to Saladin, was led by elites of the fallen Fatimid regime, and aimed to seize control over Cairo by taking advantage of Saladin's absence from the city on campaign. To this end, they are alleged to have contacted the Crusaders of the Kingdom of Jerusalem, inviting them to invade Egypt in order to lure Saladin away. The conspirators are also said to have contacted the Nizari Isma'ili Order of Assassins to assassinate Saladin. The veracity of these claims is disputed by modern historians, who consider them inventions aimed to discredit the conspirators. In the event, the conspiracy was betrayed to Saladin, although the sources differ on how exactly. Some even hold that the conspiracy was precipitated by Saladin as a political purge, or as a means of demonstrating to his increasingly hostile nominal master, the emir of Aleppo and Damascus, Nur al-Din Zengi, that Egypt was still unruly and that Saladin was indispensable to keep the opposition in check. The Ayyubid ruler struck on 31 March 1174 and arrested the ringleaders, among them the celebrated poet Umara al-Yamani. The chief conspirators were executed at the Bayn al-Qasrayn square from 6 April until 23 May, while others were exiled. A pro-Fatimid revolt in Upper Egypt followed, but was suppressed in September by Saladin's brother, al-Adil.

== Background ==
The Fatimid Caliphate was a major medieval Islamic empire that ruled large parts of North Africa, the Levant, and the western Arabian Peninsula from 909 to 1171. Beginning in Ifriqiya, after the conquest of Egypt in 969 the Fatimid dynasty established itself in a new capital there, Cairo. The Fatimid caliphs held not only secular authority, but also the religious authority of the imam of Isma'ili Shi'ism, presiding over an elaborate religious missionary network (the da'wa). In the 1060s and 1070s, the Fatimid state almost collapsed as a result of internal troubles. When central authority was restored by the vizier Badr al-Jamali, it was as a virtual military dictatorship, with power vested in the viziers as quasi-sultans and the caliphs mostly deprived of power; the last three caliphs were raised to the throne as children. During the same time, the unity of the Isma'ili mission was broken by succession disputes to the imamate, which resulted in the breaking away of the Nizari and Tayyibi branches from the official, Fatimid-sponsored Musta'li–Hafizi branch, and a Sunni reaction against Shi'a dominance became apparent even in Egypt itself.

In the 1160s, the declining Fatimid state had been reduced to Egypt. It was faced with invasions by the Crusader Kingdom of Jerusalem, domestic turmoil, and the intervention by the powerful Sunni ruler of Syria, Nur al-Din Zengi, who sent his general Shirkuh into Egypt. The complex political and military manoeuvring that followed ended in January 1169 with the appointment of Shirkuh as vizier by the Fatimid caliph, al-Adid. When Shirkuh died shortly after, his nephew Saladin was chosen as a compromise candidate from the various factions of the Syrian army to take his place. Saladin's new position was awkward: officially the head of government of a nominally Shi'a state, Saladin himself was a Sunni leading a Sunni army, as well as being a subordinate of Nur al-Din, whose championship of the Sunni cause against the Isma'ilis was well known. Saladin's intention to abolish the Fatimid regime was evident from the start, and the various factions and power groups within the Fatimid establishment, especially within the palace, were bound to oppose him. At the same time, Saladin's initial accommodation with Caliph al-Adid and the Fatimid regime, in order to secure his own position, displeased Nur al-Din, who mistrusted Saladin's motives and refused to recognize his new position.

Gradually, Saladin began undermining the Fatimid Caliphate, by introducing Nur al-Din's name in the Friday prayer after that of Caliph al-Adid, sidelining the latter, and promoting his own Syrian troops, awarding them military fiefs (iqta') for their upkeep, while withdrawing similar fiefs from the Fatimid commanders. These moves aroused the opposition of the Fatimid elites, and a conspiracy was launched, headed by the majordomo Mu'tamin al-Khilafa. According to the medieval chroniclers, Mu'tamin urged the Crusaders to invade Egypt, which would force Saladin to leave Cairo to confront them, and allow Mu'tamin and his supporters to take control of the capital and then strike at Saladin's rear. Though modern historians doubt the veracity of these reports, considering them inventions by later historians to justify Saladin's crackdown on pro-Fatimid elements, Mu'tamin was seized and executed as the leader of the putative conspiracy. This provoked an uprising of the Fatimid army's black African and Armenian troops in Cairo on 21–23 August 1169, which was harshly suppressed, followed by a wide-scale massacre of the loyalist black African troops by Saladin's men under the command of his brother, Turan-Shah.

The elimination of the Fatimid military, along with the repulsion of a Crusader attack on Damietta, and the arrival of his family from Syria, cemented Saladin's rule over Egypt. He began installing his own family and followers to civil and military positions, paving the way for the final assault on the Fatimid regime itself: all public expressions of the Isma'ili creed were abolished, and Sunnis replaced Isma'ilis in all judicial posts, including that of the chief qadi. Some of the Fatimid troops who survived the massacre in Cairo, and others who were later dismissed by Saladin as he consolidated his power, made for Upper Egypt, where they launched sporadic uprisings, but without much success. Saladin's policy culminated on 10 September 1171, when the name of the Sunni Abbasid caliph, al-Mustadi was proclaimed in the Friday prayer instead of al-Adid's. The Fatimid regime was at an end, and al-Adid's death only a few days later, on 13 September 1171, after a brief illness, only sealed its demise. After al-Adid's death, the still sizeable Isma'ili community was persecuted by Saladin's new Ayyubid regime, while the members of the Fatimid family were placed under arrest in the palace, and later in the Citadel of Cairo, where they lived out their days.

== Conspiracy and crackdown ==
Political map of the Levant in c. 1165, shortly before Saladin's assumption of power in Egypt

Over the following years, the remaining Fatimid-era elites in Cairo joined a conspiracy against Saladin. The conspiracy numbered among its members the Isma'ili missionary (da'i) and former chief qadi, Hibatallah ibn Kamil al-Mufaddal, the last Fatimid chief da'i, Abd al-Jabbar al-Jalis, and the former chief qadi, al-Hasan al-Uwairis, the senior secretary Shubruma, the military commander Abd al-Samad al-Qashsha, the head of the Fatimid sympathizers in Alexandria, Qadid al-Qafas, as well as the well-known Yemeni poet Umara al-Yamani, long established at the Fatimid court, who had continued writing poems mourning the passing of the Fatimid dynasty.

The sources differ as to the conspiracy's aims methods: a report sent after the conspiracy's uncovering to Nur al-Din by Saladin's chief secretary, Qadi al-Fadil, which later quoted by the 13th-century historians Ibn Abi Tayyi and Abu Shama, maintains that the conspirators made common cause with the Crusaders, using the services of Ibn Qarjalah, who had fled Egypt several years earlier and had helped the Crusaders plan their 1169 invasion. King Amalric of Jerusalem reportedly sent one of his courtiers, a certain George, to Cairo ostensibly for negotiations with Saladin, but in reality to meet with the conspirators, as well as Christian and Jewish scribes of the former Fatimid chancery who had been taken over by the new regime. The plan was for Amalric to campaign against Saladin in the Levant or the Mediterranean coast of Egypt, as in the Damietta operation of 1169. This would force Saladin to march himself, or at least send the bulk of his army, away from Cairo. Coupled with the customary dispersal of the remaining soldiers to their fiefs for the harvest season in late summer, the conspirators aimed to mobilize the remnants of the Fatimids' black African and Armenian troops, the former Fatimid palace personnel, and other sympathizers and seize power in Cairo. In contrast, the account of the contemporary scholar Imad al-Din al-Isfahani, as quoted by al-Bundari, does not mention any contacts with the Crusaders, while Ibn Khallikan's version, while also based on Imad al-Din, insists they did.

Qadi al-Fadil also claimed that the conspirators sent envoys to Sinan, the fabled 'Old Man of the Mountain', the leader of the Nizari Order of Assassins in Syria, with requests to assassinate Saladin. The Assassins did indeed carry out three failed assassination attempts on Saladin, in December 1174/January 1175, May 1176, and June 1176, whereupon Saladin invaded their territories before agreeing a truce with Sinan. The Assassins' motives in attacking Saladin are unclear. As a Nizari, Sinan was likely indifferent to the end of the rival Isma'ili branch that Saladin had deposed, which the Nizaris considered as heretic; Nizari agents had previously assassinated the Fatimid regent al-Afdal Shahanshah in 1121, and Caliph al-Amir in 1130. On the other hand, Saladin's championing of Sunnism, and conversely, opposition of Shi'ism of any stripe, as well as his ambition to extend his rule into Zengid Syria, which manifested itself already in summer 1174, made him a clear enemy to Nizari interests as well, even without the appeal from the conspirators in Cairo.

The conspirators also had to avoid interference by Saladin's capable brother, Turan-Shah, but in this they were fortunate: in 1173 he was dispatched to Upper Egypt to quell the disorders caused by the former Fatimid soldiery and counter the raids of the Nubian kingdom of Makuria, while in 1174, Turan-Shah sailed to Arabia, there to take over the former Fatimid areas of influence in the Hejaz (including the Muslim holy cities of Mecca and Medina) and Yemen. This not only removed a capable general, who had already helped suppress the 1169 uprising, as well as his troops from Egypt, but also the figure around whom the Ayyubid loyalists were most likely to rally around in the case of Saladin's death. Indeed, according to some accounts, the poet Umara claimed to have deliberately encouraged Turan-Shah in his ambitions away from Egypt, with exhortations such as "in front of you is the conquest of Yemen and of Syria" or "create for yourself a kingdom in which you will not be joined to another". On the other hand, as the tale of Umara shows, Turan-Shah associated himself with several high-ranking figures of the Fatimid regime, who would fall victim to the crackdown of the conspiracy.

The conspirators appear to have intended to restore the Fatimid regime, but were not united as to who should lead it: some favoured al-Adid's oldest son, Dawud, as caliph, while others, in view of Dawud's minority, favoured choosing a caliph among al-Adid's adult cousins. Likewise the vizierate was an object of contention among the descendants of the former viziers Shawar (1162–1163 and 1164–1169) and Tala'i ibn Ruzzik (1154–1161). Despite favourable conditions in 1173, when Saladin was on campaign beyond the Dead Sea and Turan-Shah occupied in Upper Egypt, the conspirators did not make a move, possibly due to the inaction of the King of Jerusalem. The conspiracy was soon betrayed, although again the sources differ on how and by whom: by Najm al-Din ibn Masal, a son of the short-lived Fatimid vizier Ibn Masal (1149), who had supported Shirkuh in the Siege of Alexandria during his 1167 campaign in Egypt, inadvertently, by the Crusader envoy George, who was befriended by a Christian agent of Saladin's; or by the preacher Zayn al-Din Ali ibn Naja, who reportedly asked for the confiscated property of Ibn Kamil al-Mufaddal as a reward. Another account suggests that Zayn al-Din was sent to investigate the commander Abd al-Samad, whom Saladin was preparing to favour, and thus stumbled on the plot. Imad al-Din maintains that the conspiracy had been infiltrated early on by Saladin's agents, who kept him abreast of the plot long before he cracked down on it.

This happened on 31 March 1174, the leaders of the conspiracy were arrested. Some freely admitted their role, others only after torture. Saladin sought a jurisconsult (fatwa) as to their fate, which was death: beginning on 6 April, with the poet Umara, and ending on 23 May with Ibn Kamil al-Mufaddal, they were executed in public and their bodies crucified on Bayn al-Qasrayn, the main square of Cairo, located between the Fatimid Great Palaces. The remaining members were exiled to Upper Egypt, while some were branded as traitors. Shortly after, a Sicilian fleet attacked Alexandria without success, which the contemporary historian Ibn al-Athir links to the conspiracy: according to his view, Amalric, who had heard of the plot's collapse, did not move, but the Sicilians, unaware of events in Cairo, proceeded with the agreed-upon plan.

== Historical assessment ==
The official account of the conspiracy, as reported by Qadi al-Fadil and repeated by most sources after, has been examined critically by modern historians, who have cast doubts on its veracity. The historian Heinz Halm by and large accepts the events as portrayed. In his 1972 biography of Saladin, Andrew Ehrenkreutz, also gives credence to the plot, but suggests that Turan-Shah's dispatch to Yemen was to remove him from Cairo, and make him unable to shield the executed men, whom he had patronized while in Egypt. Historians M. C. Lyons and D. E. P. Jackson similarly point out that Turan-Shah's expedition to Yemen was encouraged by Saladin and suited his broader political interests, while disparaging the view that Umara chiefly motivated his expedition as a "lurid suggestion". However, they express incredulity at the notion that Najm al-Din ibn Masal and Zayn al-Din, both trusted members of Saladin's close entourage, might have ever be recruited into such a plot, and that if they were indeed involved, their role may have been that of agents provocateurs to ferret out opposition to Saladin. In their view, Saladin was aware of the plot and precipitated its crackdown, due either of a desire to secure his rear in view of the anticipated Sicilian attack, or even to impress al-Sahib Muwaffaq ibn al-Qaysarani, an envoy of Nur al-Din's, who had been sent to assess Saladin's conduct and loyalty. As they put it, "Saladin could not be confident about Nur al-Din's reaction, and a first-hand account of a dangerous conspiracy would help to underline the delicacy of the situation in Egypt as well as to emphasize the difficulties and responsibilities of his own position". Indeed, Ibn al-Athir insists that Nur al-Din intended to invade Egypt and depose Saladin in the same year, before Nur al-Din's sudden death on 15 May 1174 cancelled these plans.

The historian Yaacov Lev, after careful examination of the primary accounts, concluded that the plot posed no real danger to Saladin. As Lev comments, there exists "a strange disparity between the alleged scope and threat of the plot and Saladin's action in the wake of its discovery", especially in view of the supposed exile of the former Fatimid troops that were alleged to have been ready to assist the coup to Upper Egypt, a region already in turmoil from rebellious troops and Nubian attacks. As Lev also points out, no member of the Fatimid family, kept imprisoned by Saladin, is known to have been executed as a result of the plot. According to Lev, the executions of April–May 1174 were not the result of a real conspiracy, but a purge or settling of rivalries among the post-Fatimid civilian elites; Lev in particular singles out Qadi al-Fadil, himself a former high Fatimid official, whom Umara indirectly but clearly accused of betraying the Fatimids. Military historian Michael Fulton likewise rejects the notion of a collusion with the Crusaders, of which there is no evidence in Western sources, while also pointing out the similarity of the allegation with the conspiracy of Mu'tamin in 1169. The charge may, however, have at least been lent credence, by the coincidental Sicilian attack on Alexandria in the same year. He also shares the view of Lyons and Jackson of Saladin "conveniently uncovering the Fatimid plot" just when Nur al-Din's envoy was present and his own relations with his Syrian overlord strained.

== Aftermath ==
Possibly reinforced by the troops sent there as punishment, a rebellion erupted in Upper Egypt in late summer 1174. It was led by the chieftain of the Rabi'a Bedouin, whose ancestors had held the hereditary position of governor of Aswan on the southern border of Egypt, with the title of Kanz al-Dawla. Backed by the former Fatimid soldiery and his own tribesmen, he marched north to Cairo with the declared aim of restoring the Fatimid Caliphate. At the same time, another pro-Fatimid revolt broke out near Luxor under a certain Abbas ibn Shadi, whose men raided the environs of Qus. The commander Husam al-Din Abu'l-Hayja, as well as Saladin's cousin, Izz al-Din Musik, and brother, al-Adil, were tasked with suppressing the revolt, which was swiftly achieved: Kanz al-Dawla was defeated and killed on 7 September, and by the end of the month, al-Adil was back in Cairo.

Following the defeat of this uprising, any possibility for a Fatimid restoration by military might was extinguished. In 1176/7 a pretender claiming to be al-Adid's Dawud found wide support in Qift in northern Egypt, but once more al-Adil was able to swiftly suppress the uprising. By 1188, an attempted uprising in Cairo by a small group who called out the Shi'a cry 'Family of Ali' during the night, found no response from the populace. The last pro-Fatimid, Hafizi Isma'ili communities in Egypt are attested in Upper Egypt, where they survived until the end of the Mamluk period.

== Sources ==
- Brett, Michael (2017). The Fatimid Empire. The Edinburgh History of the Islamic Empires. Edinburgh: Edinburgh University Press. ISBN 978-0-7486-4076-8.
- Ehrenkreutz, Andrew S. (1972). Saladin. Albany, NY: State University of New York Press. ISBN 0-87395-095-X.
- Fulton, Michael S. (2022). Contest for Egypt: The Collapse of the Fatimid Caliphate, the Ebb of Crusader Influence, and the Rise of Saladin. Leiden and Boston: Brill. ISBN 978-90-04-51227-6.
- Halm, Heinz (2014). Kalifen und Assassinen: Ägypten und der vordere Orient zur Zeit der ersten Kreuzzüge, 1074–1171 [Caliphs and Assassins: Egypt and the Near East at the Time of the First Crusades, 1074–1171] (in German). Munich: C. H. Beck. doi:10.17104/9783406661648-1. ISBN 978-3-406-66163-1.
- Halm, Heinz (2014). "Fāṭimids". In Fleet, Kate; Krämer, Gudrun; Matringe, Denis; Nawas, John; Rowson, Everett (eds.). Encyclopaedia of Islam (3rd ed.). Brill Online. ISSN 1873-9830.
- Lev, Yaacov (1999). Saladin in Egypt. Leiden, Boston, Köln: Brill. ISBN 90-04-11221-9.
- Lewis, Bernard (1953). "Saladin and the Assassins". Bulletin of the School of Oriental and African Studies. 15 (2). University of London: 239–245. doi:10.1017/S0041977X00111097. JSTOR 608550.
- Lyons, Malcolm Cameron; Jackson, D. E. P. (1982). Saladin: The Politics of the Holy War. Cambridge: Cambridge University Press. ISBN 0-521-31739-8.
