= Battle of the Blacks =

1169 battle between Saladin and Fatimids

Date	21–23 August 1169
Location	Cairo, Egypt
Result	Victory for Saladin's forces

Belligerents
Fatimid rebels	Saladin's Syrian forces

Commanders and leaders
Unknown	Saladin; Turan-Shah

Units involved
Black-African troops Armenian troops Pro-Fatimid citizens of Cairo	Kurdish cavalry Turkish cavalry

Strength
50,000	Unknown

Casualties and losses
Army annihilated	Heavy

The Battle of the Blacks or Battle of the Slaves was a conflict in Cairo that occurred during the Rise of Saladin in Egypt, on 21–23 August 1169, between the black African units of the Fatimid army and other pro-Fatimid elements, and Sunni Syrian troops loyal to the Fatimid vizier, Saladin. Saladin's rise to the vizierate, and his sidelining of the Fatimid caliph, al-Adid, antagonized the traditional Fatimid elites, including the army regiments, as Saladin relied chiefly on the Kurdish and Turkish cavalry that had come with him from Syria. According to the medieval sources, which are biased towards Saladin, this conflict led to an attempt by the palace majordomo, Mu'tamin al-Khilafa, to enter into an agreement with the Crusaders and jointly attack Saladin's forces to get rid of him. Saladin learned of this conspiracy and had Mu'tamin executed on 20 August. Modern historians have questioned the veracity of this report, suspecting that it may have been invented to justify Saladin's subsequent move against the Fatimid troops.

This event provoked the uprising of the black African troops of the Fatimid army, numbering some 50,000 men, who were joined by Armenian soldiers and the populace of Cairo the next day. The clashes lasted for two days, as the Fatimid troops initially attacked the vizier's palace, but were driven back to the large square between the Fatimid Great Palaces. There the black African troops and their allies appeared to be gaining the upper hand until al-Adid came out publicly against them, and Saladin ordered the burning of their settlements, located south of Cairo outside the city wall, where the black Africans' families had been left behind. The black Africans then broke and retreated in disorder to the south, until they were encircled near the Bab Zuwayla gate, where they surrendered and were allowed to cross the Nile to Giza. Despite promises of safety, they were attacked and almost annihilated there by Saladin's brother Turan-Shah.

The defeat of the Fatimid troops was a watershed in the history of Egypt and the Muslim world, as it removed the main military support of the Fatimid regime and consolidated Saladin's position as the de facto ruler of Egypt. This culminated in the restoration of Sunni dominance over Egypt and the deposition of the Fatimid dynasty in September 1171. In its place, Saladin established his own Ayyubid dynasty. Some black African troops remained in Saladin's service for a few years but most who survived the massacre of 1169 fled to Upper Egypt, where they joined unsuccessful pro-Fatimid uprisings in subsequent years.

== Saladin's rise to power in Egypt ==
In the 1160s, the declining Fatimid Caliphate of Egypt was faced with invasions by the Crusader Kingdom of Jerusalem, domestic turmoil, and the intervention by the powerful Sunni Muslim ruler of Syria, Nur al-Din, who sent his general Shirkuh into Egypt. The complex political and military manoeuvring that followed ended in January 1169 with the appointment of Shirkuh as vizier by the Fatimid caliph, al-Adid. When Shirkuh died shortly after, on 23 March 1169, his nephew Saladin was chosen as a compromise candidate from the various factions of the Syrian army to take his place.

Saladin's position was far from secure. Shirkuh's Syrian troops numbered a few thousand and their upkeep was uncertain. Saladin could count only on the loyalty of the Kurdish commanders affiliated with Shirkuh, whereas his Turkish commanders, envious of his rapid rise, might defect. At the same time, Saladin found himself as head of government of a nominally Isma'ili state while himself being a Sunni leading a Sunni army, as well as a subordinate of Nur al-Din, whose championship of the Sunni cause against the Shi'ite Isma'ilis was well known. Saladin's intention to abolish the Fatimid regime was evident from the start, and the various factions and power groups within the Fatimid establishment, especially within the palace, were bound to oppose him. The Fatimid caliphs, although politically virtually powerless, were important symbolic figures, sources of legitimacy, and in command of enormous financial resources.

This obliged Saladin to tread carefully at first, making a serious effort to establish good relations with al-Adid and promote a public image of harmony between the two. This displeased Nur al-Din, who mistrusted Saladin's motives and refused to recognize his new position. Nevertheless, in order to safeguard the Syrian position in Egypt and guard against yet another Crusader invasion, on 3 July 1169 Nur al-Din sent new troops to Egypt, under the command of Saladin's older brother, Turan-Shah. They arrived in Cairo on 29 July.

== Mu'tamin's conspiracy ==
In the meantime, Saladin gradually began distancing himself from the Fatimid regime, starting by introducing Nur al-Din's name in the Friday prayer after that of Caliph al-Adid. Al-Adid was relegated to a ceremonial role, and even publicly humiliated when Saladin entered the palace on horseback (hitherto a privilege of the caliphs). Saladin also began openly favouring his Syrian troops, awarding them military fiefs (iqta') for their upkeep, while withdrawing similar fiefs from the Fatimid commanders.

These moves aroused the opposition of the Fatimid elites, who rallied behind the black African eunuch majordomo of the caliphal palaces, Mu'tamin al-Khilafa. According to the medieval chroniclers, Mu'tamin made contact with the Crusaders, inviting them to invade Egypt. Saladin would be forced to confront them, leaving Cairo. This would allow Mu'tamin and his supporters to mount a coup to depose him, and then strike at Saladin's forces from the rear while he was facing the Crusaders. For this purpose, Mu'tamin reportedly used a Jewish messenger, who aroused suspicion in Saladin's men because his new slippers clashed with the rags he was wearing otherwise. He was arrested, and Mu'tamin's letters to the Crusaders discovered. Under torture, the messenger revealed his master's machinations.

Saladin was informed of the conspiracy, but did not act immediately. Knowing that his messenger had been intercepted, Mu'tamin for a while was cautious and did not leave the safety of the palace. On 20 August, however, he finally felt safe enough to leave Cairo for his country estate. Immediately Saladin's men seized and executed Mu'tamin, and his severed head was brought to their master.

Although the medieval sources are unanimous in reporting Mu'tamin's conspiracy, modern historians are skeptical that the conspiracy took place as described. Both M. C. Lyons and D. E. P. Jackson, as well as Lev, point out that the revelation of the messenger by his mismatched sandals is a common literary device, and the moment, following the arrival of Turan-Shah's reinforcements, was clearly opportune to settle accounts with Saladin's enemies. Other medieval sources indicate that Saladin had sought a juridical opinion which would allow him to depose and even execute al-Adid as an enemy of the faith, and his intention to move against the Fatimids is evident. Lev is convinced that whole story was nothing more than a literary invention by the later historians, who favoured Saladin, to not only justify getting rid of Mu'tamin and the black African troops as a prelude to deposing the Fatimid dynasty, but even present it as a purely defensive act on Saladin's behalf. One of Saladin's chief officials and apologists, Qadi al-Fadil, legitimized the suppression of the black African troops and their Armenian allies by couching it in religious terms, as a struggle against infidels (the Armenians) and pagans (the black Africans).

== Uprising and defeat of the black African troops ==
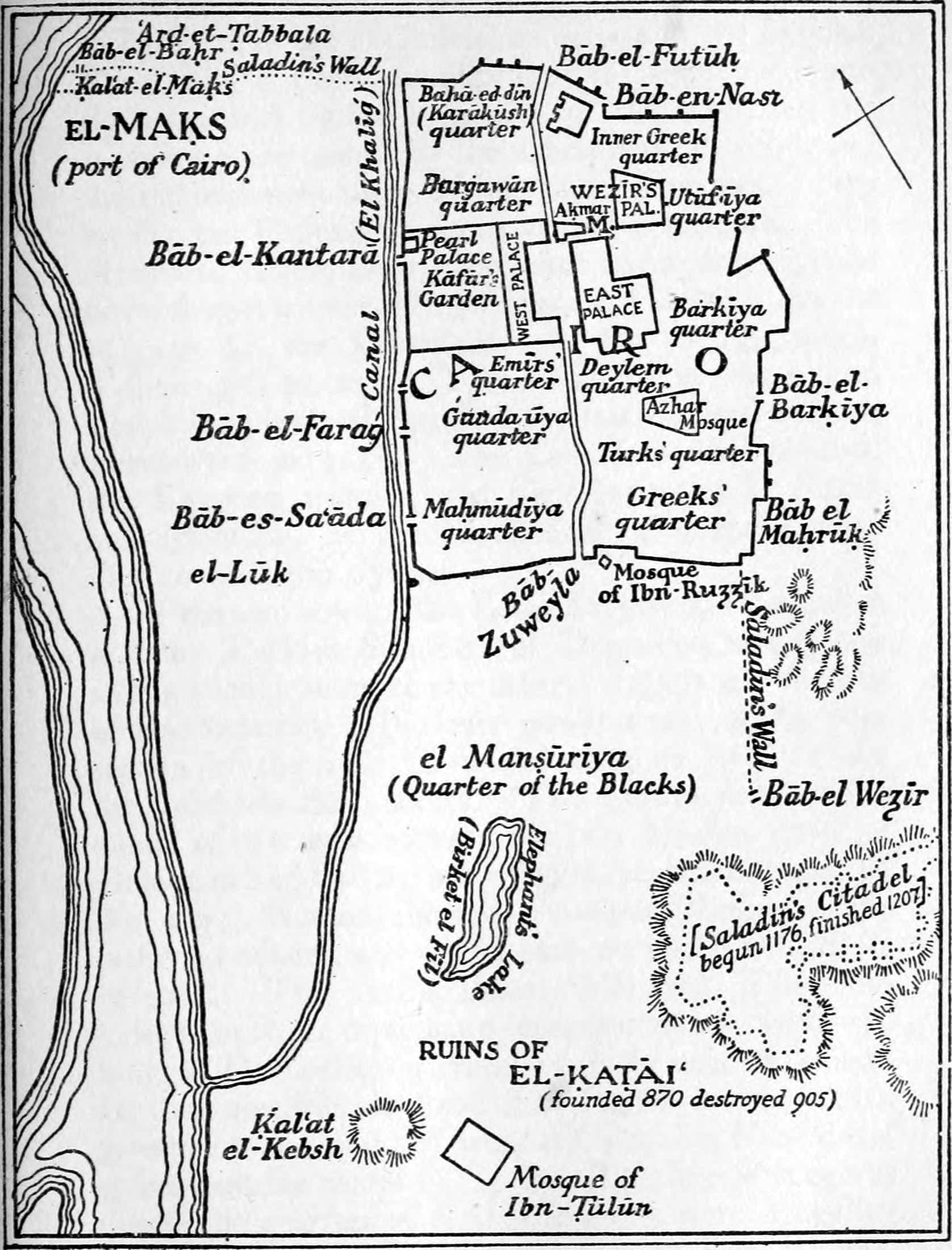
A plan of Fatimid Cairo as reconstructed by Stanley Lane-Poole, showing the approximate layout of the city and the location of the palaces

Whatever the truth, the news of Mu'tamin's murder provoked an uprising on the next day of the black African troops stationed in Cairo, who had regarded Mu'tamin as a sort of representative and champion of their interests. Black Africans (al-Sudan, also termed abid al-shira, 'bought slaves') had been long employed in Egypt as soldiers. By this time they reportedly numbered 50,000 men and formed the mainstay of the Fatimid army's infantry, along with Armenian troops. The ensuing battle was bloody, with high casualties on both sides, and lasted for two days.

The black African troops gathered in the square between the caliphal palaces and the palace of the vizier (the Dar al-Wizara), and were joined by other Fatimid troops and ordinary Cairenes. When Turan-Shah came to notify Saladin of their enemies assembling, Saladin reportedly adopted a passive attitude, waiting to see who the Caliph would support. M. C. Lyons and D. E. P. Jackson suggest that this was a tactical decision, leaving the immediate fighting to Turan-Shah while he kept himself in reserve. Together, the black Africans and their allies attacked the Dar al-Wizara, but were stopped by Turan-Shah's troops, while Saladin hastily brought his newly raised Salahiyah regiment into the fray. The clash moved to the large square between the caliphal palaces, the Bayn al-Qasrayn, where the black Africans were joined by the feared Armenian archers, while Caliph al-Adid watched from a pavilion on a tower of the palace walls.

Initially, the rebel troops seemed to prevail, pushing the Syrians back. The palace troops began throwing stones and shooting arrows on Saladin's soldiers as well, although the sources say that it is unclear whether this happened at al-Adid's command or not. Believing that the Caliph had turned against the Syrians, Turan-Shah ordered his naphtha archers (naffatin) to target the Caliph's pavilion. Before they could start firing, a messenger from al-Adid appeared at the gate of the tower where the pavilion stood, and loudly shouted out to Turan-Shah, encouraging him to fight against the "slave dogs" until they were driven out of the country. The black African troops, who believed they had been fighting in support of the Caliph, were dismayed by this public betrayal, and lost heart.

At the same time, Saladin sent some of his troops to the quarter of al-Mansura ('the Victorious'), south of the Bab Zuwayla gate, where the black Africans had their homes. There they set fire to the quarter, and attacked the black Africans' women and children. At news of this attack on their defenceless families, the black Africans broke and began retreating to the Bab Zuwayla. Saladin's reserves occupied the side streets, forcing the black Africans to retreat down the main thoroughfare and depriving them of any ability to evade via the side streets or using them to flank their pursuers. The black Africans offered only occasional resistance in isolated houses, which the pursuing Syrians often simply torched. Some Armenian archers tried to stem the Syrians' advance, but their barracks, located near the Fatimid palaces, were likewise torched, killing them all.

The black Africans did not manage to escape the city: at the market of the sword sellers, some 550 metres (1,800 ft) north of Bab Zuwayla, they found themselves hemmed in from all sides. Driven at last to Bab Zuwayla, they found its doors closed, and agreed to submit. Saladin agreed, provided they left Cairo, and granted them safe passage to Giza on the other side of the Nile. There the black Africans were attacked and killed by Turan-Shah, with only a few surviving.

== Aftermath ==
The conflict, known in Arabic chronicles as the "Battle of the Blacks" or "Battle of the Slaves", was, according to the historian Yaacov Lev, "[t]he single most important event in Saladin's rise to power in Egypt". In its aftermath, Saladin set about taking control of the administrative machinery and installing his Syrian followers and his immediate family in critical positions. Mu'tamin was replaced by a white eunuch, Saladin's confidant Baha al-Din Qaraqush, and all the other black African eunuchs were dismissed from palace service. Saladin's men seized the properties of the expelled black African and Armenian troops, both in Cairo and across Egypt. Saladin began billeting his own officers and troops in the vacated properties of Cairo, while the quarter of al-Mansura was levelled to the ground and later converted into a garden.

Al-Adid's unclear role in the clashes rendered him suspect in the eyes of Saladin's commanders, but for the moment he was not harmed. Deprived of any loyal troops, and closely watched over in his own palace by Qaraqush, he was now completely at Saladin's mercy. Saladin's victory paved the way for a gradual but inexorable assault on the Fatimid regime itself, that spanned the years 1170–1171. The Shi'a form of the call to prayer was changed back to the Sunni form on 25 August 1170, and public lecture sessions of the Isma'ili creed abolished. Sunnis replaced Isma'ilis in all judicial posts, including that of the chief qadi. This policy culminated on 10 September 1171, when the name of the Sunni Abbasid caliph, al-Mustadi, instead of al-Adid's, was proclaimed in the Friday prayer. The Fatimid regime was at an end, and al-Adid's death only a few days later, on 13 September 1171, after a brief illness, only sealed its demise. After al-Adid's death, the still sizeable Isma'ili community was persecuted by Saladin's new Ayyubid regime, while the members of the Fatimid family were placed under arrest in the palace, and later in the Citadel of Cairo, where they lived out their days.

Only a fraction of the black African troops escaped the events, fleeing south to Upper Egypt. Saladin tasked his uncle, Shihab al-Din al-Harimi, with pursuing them and killing them. Over the following months, Saladin continued his phasing-out of the Fatimid army units, which provoked further resistance. Fatimid troops rose in revolt in Qus under their commander, Abbas ibn Shadhi, and although they were quickly defeated, other areas of Upper Egypt remained in turmoil due to the restiveness of the Bedouin and the presence of fugitive black African soldiery.

At least some of the black African and Armenian troops may have been retained in service, however, or have been left unmolested in or near Cairo, as they are mentioned during the abortive pro-Fatimid conspiracy of 1174, when the conspirators hoped to use them to seize Cairo during Saladin's absence on campaign against the Crusaders. Following the discovery of the affair and the execution of its leaders, these troops were banished to Upper Egypt. There they soon joined the uprising of the governor of Aswan, Kanz al-Dawla, who marched on Cairo with the intention of restoring the Fatimids. The rebels were defeated in September 1174 by Saladin's brother, al-Adil. As with Mu'tamin's conspiracy, Yaacov Lev has expressed doubts on the veracity of the details reported, as the traditional account of the conspiracy rests chiefly on a letter by Qadi al-Fadl. The letter repeats the motif of a collusion with the Crusaders, which is not found in the only other major contemporary account, that of Imad al-Din al-Isfahani. Furthermore, according to Lev, the exile of rebellious pro-Fatimid troops to an already restive region such as Upper Egypt does not make sense. Lev suggests that the affair represented a purge of "harmless persons who were in no position to endanger Saladin's rule", but who were "victims of old rivalries within the civilian elite", and that Saladin was effectively manipulated into ordering their deaths.

== Assessment in historiography ==
The Battle of the Blacks has been interpreted differently by various modern scholars. Thus Andrew S. Ehrenkreutz, in his 1972 biography of Saladin, used the events to highlight his portrait of the Ayyubid sultan as a "ruthless careerist" (in the words of Michael Brett). Jere L. Bacharach emphasized that the opposition of the black Africans to Saladin was not driven so much by loyalty to the Fatimid dynasty, but by the fact that Saladin's army represented a different military system, reliant exclusively on cavalry, in which they had no role to play. As Bacharach comments, after the disbandment of the black African regiments, "a standing, salaried infantry would return to Egypt only with the Ottomans in 923/1517".

The historian Bernard Lewis noted that while the clash did not have primarily racial but rather political motives, its subsequent treatment by pro-Saladin chroniclers carries racial undertones, emphasizing the arrogance and indiscipline of the black African troops, who had frequently been involved in political intrigues in past decades and now received their just punishment. Imad al-Din, for example, writes that "whenever [the black Africans] rose against a vizier they killed him", and that "they thought that all white men were pieces of fat and that all black African men were coals". Lewis also points out that while white troops of the Fatimid army were incorporated into Saladin's forces, the black African ones were not. Even in the succeeding Mamluk Sultanate of Cairo, black Africans were employed in the army only as menial slaves, and a strict policy of segregation with the free white soldiers was in place.

== See also ==
- Slavery in the Fatimid Caliphate

== Sources ==
- Bacharach, Jere L. (November 1981). "African Military Slaves in the Medieval Middle East: The Cases of Iraq (869–955) and Egypt (868–1171)". International Journal of Middle East Studies. 13 (4): 471–495. doi:10.1017/S0020743800055860. JSTOR 162910. S2CID 161458709.
- Brett, Michael (2017). The Fatimid Empire. The Edinburgh History of the Islamic Empires. Edinburgh: Edinburgh University Press. ISBN 978-0-7486-4076-8.
- Ehrenkreutz, Andrew S. (1972). Saladin. Albany, NY: State University of New York Press. ISBN 0-87395-095-X.
- Halm, Heinz (2014). Kalifen und Assassinen: Ägypten und der vordere Orient zur Zeit der ersten Kreuzzüge, 1074–1171 [Caliphs and Assassins: Egypt and the Near East at the Time of the First Crusades, 1074–1171] (in German). Munich: C. H. Beck. doi:10.17104/9783406661648-1. ISBN 978-3-406-66163-1.
- Lev, Yaacov (1999). Saladin in Egypt. Leiden, Boston, Köln: Brill. ISBN 90-04-11221-9.
- Lewis, Bernard (1990). Race and Slavery in the Middle East: An Historical Enquiry. Oxford and New York: Oxford University Press. ISBN 0-19-506283-3.
- Lyons, Malcolm Cameron; Jackson, D. E. P. (1982). Saladin: The Politics of the Holy War. Cambridge: Cambridge University Press. ISBN 0-521-31739-8.
