= Al-Adid =

Last Fatimid caliph (1160–1171) and imam

al-Adid li-Dīnallāh; العاضد لدين الله
- Caliph; Amir al-Mu'minīn

Imam–Caliph of the Fatimid Caliphate
- Reign: 1160–1171
- Predecessor: al-Fa'iz bi-Nasr Allah
- Successor: Saladin (as sultan of the Ayyubid dynasty); Daoud al-Hamid li-'llah (as Hafizi imam)
- Born: 9 May 1151; Cairo, Fatimid Caliphate
- Died: 13 September 1171 (aged 20); Cairo, Fatimid Caliphate
- Spouse: Daughter of Tala'i ibn Ruzzik
- Issue: Daoud; Abu'l-Futuh; Isma'il
- Dynasty: Fatimid
- Father: Yusuf ibn al-Hafiz
- Religion: Isma'ilism

Abū Muḥammad ʿAbd Allāh ibn Yūsuf ibn al-Ḥāfiẓ (Arabic: أبو محمد عبد الله بن يوسف بن الحافظ; 1151–1171), better known by his regnal name al-ʿĀḍid li-Dīn Allāh (Arabic: العاضد لدين الله, lit. 'Strengthener of God's Faith'), was the fourteenth and last caliph of the Fatimid dynasty, and the twenty-fourth imam of the Hafizi Isma'ili branch of Shi'a Islam, reigning from 1160 to 1171.

Like his two immediate predecessors, al-Adid came to the throne as a child, and spent his reign as a puppet of various strongmen who occupied the vizierate. He was a mostly helpless bystander to the slow collapse of the Fatimid Caliphate. Tala'i ibn Ruzzik, the vizier who had raised al-Adid to the throne, fell victim to a palace plot in 1161, and was replaced by his son, Ruzzik ibn Tala'i. Ruzzik was in turn overthrown by Shawar in 1163, but the latter lasted only a few months in office before being overthrown by Dirgham. The constant power struggles in Cairo enfeebled the Fatimid state, allowing both the Crusader Kingdom of Jerusalem and the Sunni ruler of Syria, Nur al-Din, to advance their own designs on the country. The Crusaders repeatedly invaded Egypt, extracting tribute and ultimately aiming to conquer it; in turn, Nur al-Din supported Shawar's bid to retake the vizierate from Dirgham, and sent his general Shirkuh to counter the Crusaders. For a while, Shawar played the Crusaders and Syrians against one another, but in January 1169, Shirkuh overthrew Shawar, occupied Cairo and became vizier. When Shirkuh died shortly after, he was succeeded by his nephew, Saladin.

Saladin was initially conciliatory towards al-Adid, but quickly consolidated his hold over Egypt, and proceeded to gradually dismantle the Fatimid regime. Fatimid loyalists in the army were purged and replaced with Syrian troops, culminating in the failed mutiny of the Battle of the Blacks. Members of Saladin's family were installed as governors, the civilian bureaucracy was largely won over to the new regime, and al-Adid was sidelined even from ceremonial roles. Finally, Isma'ilism was progressively abolished as the state religion in favour of Sunni Islam, culminating in the official proclamation of Abbasid suzerainty in September 1171. Al-Adid died a few days later. His family was placed under house arrest, and Isma'ilism persecuted by Saladin's new Ayyubid regime, so that within a century after the fall of the Fatimid regime it had almost disappeared in Egypt.

== Origin ==
The future al-Adid was born on 9 May 1151, according to the commonly accepted date, provided by the thirteenth-century historian Ibn Khallikan. Other authors, however, give earlier years, in 1145 or 1149. He was the son of the Fatimid prince Yusuf, a younger son of the eleventh Fatimid caliph, al-Hafiz li-Din Allah (r. 1132–1149). Yusuf was one of the oldest surviving sons of al-Hafiz, but at the latter's death, the powerful vizier Salim ibn Masal installed al-Hafiz's youngest son, the 16-year-old Isma'il, as caliph with the regnal name al-Zafir bi-Amr Allah. Al-Zafir was assassinated in 1154 by his vizier, Abbas ibn Abi'l-Futuh. The vizier raised al-Zafir's five-year-old son Isa to the throne under the name al-Fa'iz bi-Nasr Allah, and had Yusuf and another older brother of al-Zafir's, Jibril, executed on the same day.

By this time, the Fatimid dynasty was in decline. The official doctrine of Isma'ili Shi'ism had lost its appeal and was weakened by succession disputes and schisms, and the dynasty's legitimacy was increasingly challenged by a Sunni resurgence in Egypt. As the fate of al-Zafir shows, the Fatimid caliphs themselves had become virtual puppets in the hands of their powerful chief ministers: the viziers bore the royal title of sultan, and their names were included in the Friday sermons and on coins alongside the caliph's. The historian Yaacov Lev sums up the state of Egypt as "The Sick Man on the Nile". The weakness of the Isma'ili Fatimid regime was noticed by its Sunni rivals, the Abbasids of Baghdad: in 1154, the Abbasid caliph al-Muqtafi (r. 1136–1160) issued a diploma appointing the Zengid ruler of Syria, Nur al-Din (r. 1146–1174), as the nominal ruler of Egypt.

== Reign ==
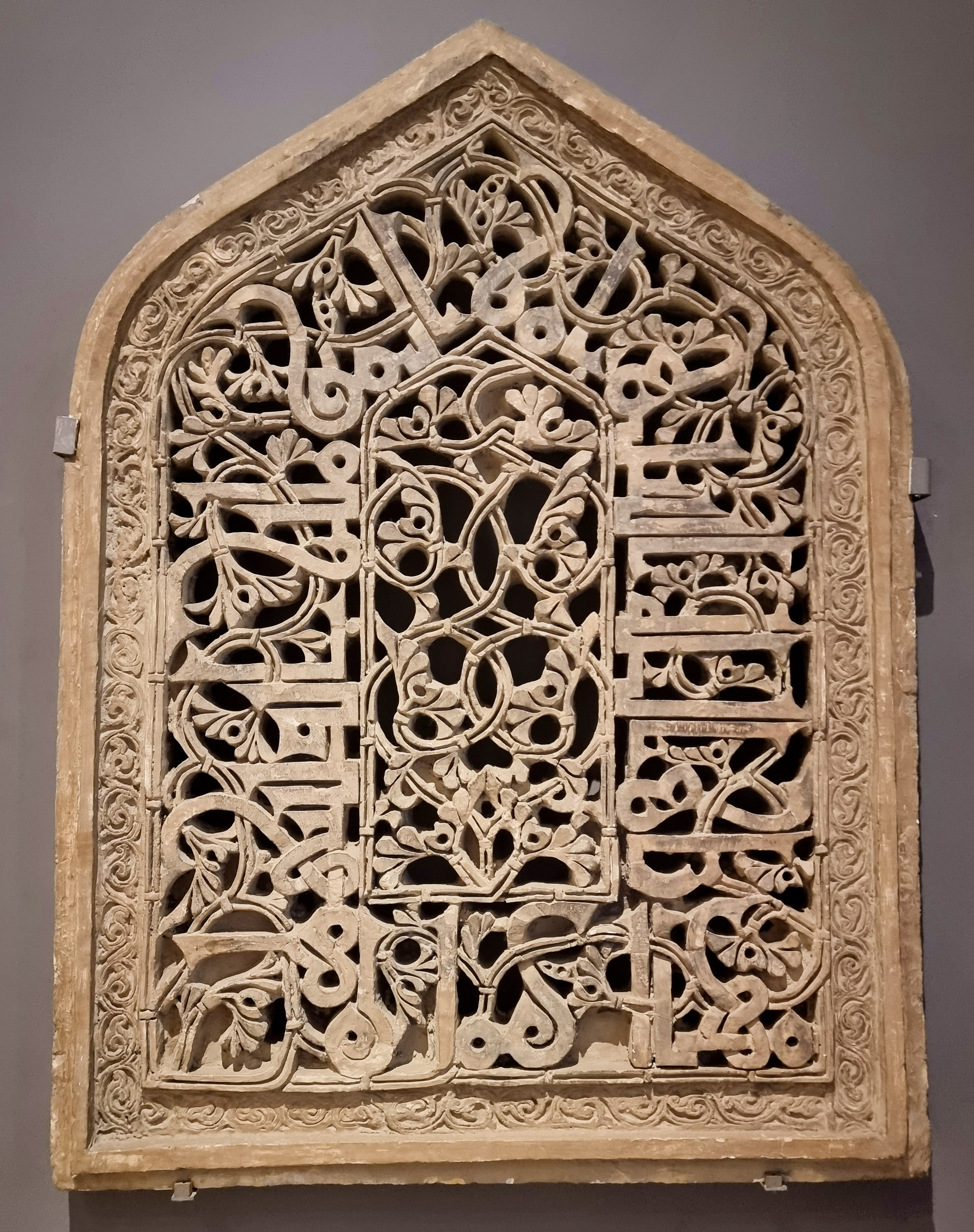
Stucco window from the Al-Salih Tala'i Mosque, built in Cairo during al-Adid's reign

Al-Fa'iz was of sickly disposition and died on 22 July 1160, aged only eleven years. Lacking a direct heir, nine-year-old al-Adid was elevated to the throne by another all-powerful vizier, Tala'i ibn Ruzzik, on 23 July 1160. To further cement his hold over the caliph, Ibn Ruzzik married him to one of his daughters. Throughout his reign, al-Adid was little more than a figurehead monarch, effectively a puppet in the hands of courtiers and strongmen who disputed with one another over the spoils of the tottering Fatimid state. As the French orientalist Gaston Wiet comments, "The Arab writers seem uncertain, and intermittently attribute to him stray impulses of revolt, which had little success [...] in general the caliph looked on helplessly at a shattering series of tragic incidents of which he himself was finally to be the victim."

As a result of the lack of information about al-Adid, his personal traits are not well known. Ibn Khallikan reports that he was violently pro-Shi'a, while the only physical description of him is by the Crusader historian William of Tyre, on the occasion of an audience with Crusader leaders: his face was veiled, but his appearance was described as that of "a young man of an extremely generous disposition, whose first beard was just appearing; he was tall, of swarthy complexion and good frame."

=== Power struggles in Cairo ===
==== Fall of Banu Ruzzik ====
Ibn Ruzzik, who was inclined towards the Twelver branch of Shi'ism, was assassinated on 11 September 1161, possibly with the knowledge of the young caliph, as the deed was said to have been instigated by one of al-Adid's aunts, Sitt al-Qusur. Nevertheless, his place was immediately taken by his son, Ruzzik ibn Tala'i, who likewise denied any power to the caliph. The new vizier had Sitt al-Qusur strangled, while al-Adid came under the auspices of another aunt, who had to swear that she had not been involved in the murder plot. Soon after, the new vizier suppressed the last revolt by a claimant of the rival Nizari line of the Fatimid dynasty, Muhammad ibn al-Husayn ibn Nizar: arriving from the Maghreb (western North Africa), he had tried to raise Cyrenaica and Alexandria in revolt, but was captured and executed in August 1162.

Al-Adid—or rather, a palace clique acting through him—turned to Shawar, the governor of Upper Egypt, for support in deposing Ruzzik. With the backing of a Bedouin army, Shawar was indeed successful in capturing Cairo in late December 1162, and had his predecessor executed; he too assumed complete control of the government, excluding the caliph from public affairs. As the contemporary poet Umara al-Yamani commented, "with the end of the Banu Ruzzik ended the Egyptian dynasty".

==== Dirgham overthrows Shawar ====
Shawar was evicted from Cairo in August 1163 by the majordomo Dirgham, but escaped to his Bedouin supporters, before travelling to Damascus to seek the assistance of Nur al-Din. This was an ominous development for the Fatimids. For Nur al-Din, whom the historian Farhad Daftary describes as a "fervent Sunni", Shawar's arrival opened the possibility of intervening in Egypt, not only in order to unify the core territories of the Muslim world under his rule, but also in order to overthrow the Isma'ili Shi'ite Fatimid regime and return the country to Sunni Abbasid allegiance.

=== Foreign interventions and the fall of Dirgham ===
In the meantime, Dirgham's regime in Egypt became ever more unpopular, and he quickly lost support among the military. At the same time, the turmoil in Egypt opened the path for intervention by the Crusader Kingdom of Jerusalem: the Crusaders coveted Egypt not only for its riches, but also in order to prevent a takeover by Nur al-Din, which would expose their kingdom to attacks from two directions. Already during Ibn Ruzzik's vizierate, an invasion by King Baldwin III of Jerusalem (r. 1143–1163) had to be bought off by the payment of an annual tribute. Baldwin's successor, Amalric (r. 1163–1174), seriously considered conquering Egypt. In September 1163 he invaded the country, but was forced to retreat after the Fatimids broke the dams that held back the Nile's cresting floodwaters and inundated the plains of the Nile Delta.

The obvious vulnerability of Egypt to the Crusaders encouraged Nur al-Din to agree to provide assistance to Shawar, who promised in return to send him a third of Egypt's revenue as tribute, and to become his vassal. The remaining two thirds were to be split up between al-Adid and Shawar. Shawar was sent back to Egypt accompanied by a small expeditionary force, barely a thousand strong, under the Kurdish general Shirkuh, who was joined by his nephew, Saladin. This double foreign intervention was a significant point of rupture in the history of the Fatimid state and Egypt: enfeebled by the constant civil wars, but still possessing a vibrant economy and immense resources, the country now became a prize in the wider struggle between Damascus and Jerusalem. Both powers aimed to take over Egypt while preventing the other from doing so, leading to the eventual downfall of the Fatimid dynasty.

Dirgham appealed to Amalric for help against the Syrians, but the King of Jerusalem was unable to intervene in time: in late April 1164, the Syrians surprised and defeated Dirgham's brother at Bilbays, opening the way to Cairo. On the news of the battle, a panic broke out in the capital of Egypt. Desperate for funds to pay his men, Dirgham confiscated the possessions of orphans, thereby provoking a public outcry against him. His troops began deserting him. Left with only 500 horsemen, he appeared in the square before the caliphal palace demanding that al-Adid appear, but the caliph, who had already entered into talks with Shawar, turned him away and advised him to save his life. As his troops continued to defect, Dirgham fled the capital, but was killed by one of Shawar's men.

=== Shawar's second vizierate ===
Political map of the Levant in c. 1165

Shawar was restored to the vizierate on 26 May 1164, but quickly fell out with Shirkuh, who attacked Cairo. Shawar now asked for Amalric's help in driving the Syrian army out of Egypt. Shirkuh and Saladin confronted the Crusaders at Bilbays for three months, until Nur al-Din captured Harim in Syria, forcing Amalric to retreat north in November 1164. Left dangerously short of supplies, Shirkuh was obliged to follow suit, after receiving 50,000 dinars from Shawar.

Shawar's position was secured, for a time: having experienced Egypt, its wealth, and the feebleness of its regime, Shirkuh persuaded Nur al-Din to send him again south in January 1167. Learning of this, Amalric gathered his forces and invaded Egypt himself, even before Shawar agreed to an alliance with the Crusaders against the Syrians. To seal the treaty, Hugh of Caesarea entered Cairo to receive the assent of al-Adid in person; Hugh's description of the caliphal audience is one of the very few surviving descriptions of the Fatimid palaces. A Crusader garrison was installed on the walls of Cairo, and the Fatimids and Crusaders jointly confronted the Syrian troops. At the Battle of al-Babein on 18 March 1167, the Syrians were victorious, but shortly after, Saladin was besieged at Alexandria. This forced Shirkuh to come to terms, and in August 1167, both Syrians and Crusaders once again left Egypt, leaving a Crusader garrison in Cairo, as well as an official responsible for collecting an annual tribute of 100,000 gold dinars due to the King of Jerusalem.

This de facto submission to the Crusaders displeased many at the Fatimid court, including Shawar's own son, al-Kamil Shuja, who secretly contacted Nur al-Din for assistance. The Syrians were pre-empted, however, by Amalric, who in October 1168 set out to conquer Egypt; even before launching their campaign, the Crusader leaders divided the country among themselves. As the Crusaders entered Egypt and massacred the inhabitants of Bilbays on 5 November 1168, al-Kamil Shuja persuaded al-Adid to call upon Nur al-Din for assistance. Shawar vehemently opposed this, warning the young caliph of the dire consequences for himself if the Syrians should prevail. Nevertheless, the horrifying news of the massacre at Bilbays rallied opposition to the Crusader advance, and al-Adid is reported to have sent a plea for aid in secret, although this may be an invention by later chroniclers eager to justify Saladin's rise to power. In the meantime, the Crusaders arrived before the gates of Cairo, and began a siege of the city. Shawar had to evacuate the unwalled sister city of Fustat. The sources claim that Shawar, apparently in panic, had the city torched to the ground, but this may be a later invention, and the extent of the destruction was likely much exaggerated. The siege lasted until 2 January 1169, when the Crusaders departed on the approach of the Syrian troops; on 8 January, Shirkuh and his 6,000 men arrived before Cairo.

After a few days of uneasy coexistence, Shawar was seized by Shirkuh's men on 18 January 1169, during a visit to the Syrian camp. Al-Adid is reported to have urged, or at least consented to, the execution of his vizier, which took place on the same day. Two days later, Shirkuh was appointed vizier, with the title of al-Malik al-Mansur (lit. 'the Victorious King'). Shirkuh's sudden rise alarmed the Crusaders, and displeased Nur al-Din, who mistrusted his subordinate's intentions; the Syrian ruler even wrote to al-Adid, asking him to send the Syrian troops—and their commander—home. Al-Adid did not reply, and was apparently satisfied with his new minister, as Shirkuh appeared to respect the Fatimid institutions, leaving the regime's officials in their place.

=== Saladin's vizierate ===
Shirkuh died from choking on his meal on 23 March 1169. His unexpected departure left a power vacuum, both in the Fatimid government as well as the Syrian expeditionary force. The Fatimid elites conferred in the caliphal palace. Some proposed that Saladin be appointed to the vizierate, while others, led by the eunuch majordomo Mu'tamin al-Khilafa Jawhar, suggested that the Syrians should be given military fiefs (iqta') in the Nile Delta, thus removing them from Cairo, and that no vizier should be appointed, with al-Adid resuming personal rule like his predecessors at the beginning of the dynasty. The Syrian commanders also vied among themselves for the leadership, until Saladin emerged as the favoured candidate. Then, on 26 March 1169, Saladin was received at the caliphal palace and appointed to the vizierate, with the title of al-Malik al-Nasir (lit. 'the King who Brings Victory'). The fiction that Saladin was al-Adid's servant was upheld, but the real balance of power is shown by the fact that in the document of investiture, for the first time, the vizierate was declared as hereditary.

Nevertheless, Saladin's position was far from secure. His forces numbered a few thousand and, even though superior in combat ability, were massively outnumbered by the Fatimid troops. Furthermore, Saladin could not fully rely on the loyalty of his own commanders. Saladin's role in the Fatimid state was also a source of contradictions: he was a Sunni, who had come into Egypt with a Sunni army, and who still owed allegiance to Nur al-Din's militantly Sunni regime; but as vizier of the Fatimid caliph, he was in charge of a nominally Isma'ili state, and even of the Isma'ili religious establishment (da'wa). The Fatimid elites in the court and the army were bound to oppose Saladin's attempts to dismantle the Egyptian regime, while Nur al-Din was distrustful of his erstwhile subordinate's intentions. This obliged Saladin to tread carefully at first, making a serious effort to establish good relations with al-Adid and promote a public image of harmony between the two. After additional Syrian troops arrived under the command of Saladin's older brother, Turan-Shah, Saladin gradually distanced himself from the Fatimid regime, starting by introducing Nur al-Din's name in the Friday sermon after that of al-Adid. Al-Adid was relegated to a ceremonial role, and even publicly humiliated when Saladin entered the palace on horseback (hitherto a privilege of the caliphs). Saladin also began openly favouring his Syrian troops, awarding them military fiefs for their upkeep, while withdrawing similar fiefs from the Fatimid commanders. Lev points out that a considerable part of the Fatimid civilian bureaucracy, many of them by now Sunnis, had become alienated from the regime they served. Many of them—most notably the chancery official Qadi al-Fadil—chose to collaborate with Saladin and effectively helped him undermine the Fatimid regime.

The pro-Fatimid opposition against the ascendancy of Saladin and his Syrians coalesced around Mu'tamin al-Khilafa Jawhar. The conspirators reportedly did not hesitate to contact the Crusaders for help, in the hopes that a new Crusader invasion would draw Saladin away from Cairo, allowing them to seize control of the capital. When a letter to this effect fell into his hands, Saladin seized the opportunity to quickly and ruthlessly purge Cairo of his rivals, and Mu'tamin al-Khalifa was assassinated. Thereupon, on 21 August 1169, the Black African troops rose in revolt. In street fighting that lasted for two days, Saladin defeated them and ousted them from the city. They were pursued and defeated by Turan-Shah, while their quarters in the suburb of al-Mansuriyya were burnt. In the aftermath, Saladin appointed his confidante, Baha al-Din Qaraqush, as majordomo of the caliphal palaces, thus securing control of the caliph and his court.

Deprived of any loyal troops and closely watched over in his own palace by Qaraqush, al-Adid was now completely at Saladin's mercy. When a joint Byzantine–Crusader attack was launched on Damietta in October–December 1169, al-Adid handed over a million dinars to finance the expedition sent against the invaders. The historian Michael Brett sees in this a measure of accommodation by the caliph to the new situation, but Lev speaks of blatant "extortion" of al-Adid by Saladin, pointing out that the caliph was effectively under house arrest, and that his contribution of such an enormous sum only served to weaken his position. When Saladin's father, Ayyub, arrived in Cairo in March 1170, the caliph in person rode out with Saladin to meet him—an unheard-of honour—and awarded him the title al-Malik al-Awhad (lit. 'the Singular King').

With his position secure, Saladin solidified control of the administrative machinery of Egypt by appointing Syrians instead of native Egyptians to all public posts. As part of this, his immediate family were appointed to the most important provincial governorships. At the same time, Saladin began a slow but inexorable assault on the ideological foundations of the Fatimid state. On 25 August 1170, the call to prayer was changed from the Shi'a formula back to the Sunni one, and the first three Rashidun caliphs included, a practice offensive to Shi'a doctrine. Even al-Adid's name was subtly excluded from it by replacing it with a formula that sought God's blessings for "He who Strengthens God's Faith"—which, as the historian Heinz Halm remarks, could refer to al-Adid's regnal name, but also to "any pious Muslim, even the Sunni caliph of Baghdad". In mid-1170, al-Adid was forbidden from attending the Friday and festival prayers in state. In September 1170, Sunni madrasas were established in the old capital of Fustat; and all juridical posts were filled with Shafi'i Sunnis, mostly Syrians or Kurds. In February 1171, even the chief qadi was replaced by a Sunni appointee, followed by the final suspension of the public lectures of the Isma'ili doctrine at the al-Azhar Mosque. The Sunni jurists even issued a legal decision which allowed Saladin to legally execute al-Adid as a heretic.

=== Death and the end of the Fatimid Caliphate ===
Saladin's assault on the Fatimid regime culminated on 10 September 1171, when the Shafi'i jurist Najm al-Din al-Khabushani publicly proclaimed the name of the Sunni Abbasid caliph, al-Mustadi (r. 1170–1180), instead of al-Adid's, and read out a list of the Fatimids' crimes. This symbolic act restored the country to Abbasid suzerainty after two centuries of Isma'ili Fatimid rule, but was met by general indifference among the Egyptian populace. The Fatimid regime was at an end, but al-Adid likely never learned of it, being already on his deathbed due to a severe illness. His death on 13 September 1171 at the age of twenty only sealed the demise of the Fatimid Caliphate. Some medieval sources claim that al-Adid either committed suicide, was poisoned, or was murdered by Turan-Shah when he refused to reveal where his treasures were hidden, but according to Halm, there is "no serious evidence for a violent elimination" of the caliph, and Saladin's own utterances suggest he thought that the caliph had died of natural causes.

Saladin's reaction to al-Adid's death was careful: he attended the funeral for al-Adid in person, but also organized a parade of his troops as a show of force against any lingering pro-Fatimid sentiment. Publicly, it was stated simply that al-Adid had failed to appoint his oldest son, Daoud, as heir, and thus the caliphal throne was vacant. While Saladin put on a public show of grief, the death of al-Adid and the end of the Fatimid Caliphate caused undisguised jubilation among the Sunni partisans of Saladin's own entourage: Saladin's secretary, al-Katib al-Isfahani, wrote a celebratory poem likening al-Adid to Pharaoh and Saladin to Joseph (Yusuf in Arabic, Saladin's birth name), and calling him a bastard and a heretic. When the news reached Baghdad, the city was festooned in Abbasid black, and Caliph al-Mustadi sent robes of honour to Saladin and Nur al-Din.

After al-Adid's death, the still sizeable Isma'ili community was persecuted by Saladin's new Ayyubid regime. The Fatimid family was placed under effective house arrest in the palace. Al-Adid's heir-apparent, Daoud al-Hamid li-'llah (imamate: 1171–1208), was recognized by the Hafizi Isma'ili faithful as the rightful imam, but he, like his own son and successor Sulayman Badr al-Din (imamate: 1208–1248), lived and died in captivity. A series of abortive conspiracies and uprisings under pro-Fatimid sympathizers or Fatimid pretenders erupted in the 1170s and continued sporadically, with much diminished impact, until the end of the century. By the end of the thirteenth century, Isma'ilism had been effectively purged from Egypt. The last three surviving members of the dynasty are attested in 1262, when the Mamluk ruler Baybars ordered an inventory of the confiscated Fatimid possessions: they were Kamal al-Din Isma'il, one of al-Adid's sons, and two grandsons, Abu'l-Qasim ibn Abi'l-Futuh ibn al-Adid and Abd al-Wahhab ibn Isma'il ibn al-Adid. Nothing further is known of them; presumably they died still imprisoned in the Citadel of Cairo.

Family tree of the Fatimid dynasty

Abu Muhammad Abdallah **al-Mahdi bi'llah** (r. 909–934)
Abu'l-Qasim Muhammad **al-Qa'im bi-Amr Allah** (r. 934–946)	Abu Ali Ahmad	Other children
al-Qasim^{§}	Abu Tahir Isma'il **al-Mansur bi'llah** (r. 946–953)	Other children
Abu Tamim Ma'ad **al-Mu'izz li-Din Allah** (r. 953–975)	Abd al-Rahim^{§}
Tamim	Abdallah^{§}	Abu Mansur Nizar **al-Aziz bi'llah** (r. 975–996)	Other children
Amina	Abu Ali Mansur **al-Hakim bi-Amr Allah** (r. 996–1021)	Sitt al-Mulk	Other children
Abu'l-Hasan Ali **al-Zahir li-I'zaz Din Allah** (r. 1021–1036)
Abu Tamim Ma'ad **al-Mustansir bi'llah** (r. 1036–1094)
Abu Mansur Nizar^{§} (elder son)	Abu Abdallah	Abdallah	Isma'il	Abu'l-Qasim Muhammad	Other children	Abu'l-Qasim Ahmad **al-Musta'li bi'llah** (r. 1094–1101)
al-Husayn	Nizari imams (claimed descent)	Abu'l-Maymun Abd al-Majid **al-Hafiz li-Din Allah** (r. 1132–1149)	Abu Ali Mansur **al-Amir bi-Ahkam Allah** (r. 1101–1130)	Ja'far	Other children
Sulayman^{§}	Haydara^{§}	Hasan^{§}	Abu Mansur Isma'il **al-Zafir bi-Amr Allah** (r. 1149–1154)	Yusuf	Other children	Abu'l-Qasim al-Tayyib^{§}
Abu'l-Qasim Isa **al-Fa'iz bi-Nasr Allah** (r. 1154–1160)	Abu Muhammad Abdallah **al-Adid li-Din Allah** (r. 1160–1171)	Tayyibi hidden imams (claimed descent)
Dawud
Sulayman

^{§} denotes designated heirs who did not accede to the throne
denotes ruling Fatimid caliphs (with regnal names in **bold** and regnal dates)

== Sources ==
- Brett, Michael (2017). The Fatimid Empire. The Edinburgh History of the Islamic Empires. Edinburgh: Edinburgh University Press. ISBN 978-0-7486-4076-8.
- Daftary, Farhad (2007). The Ismāʿı̄lı̄s: Their History and Doctrines (Second ed.). Cambridge: Cambridge University Press. ISBN 978-0-521-61636-2.
- Ehrenkreutz, Andrew S. (1972). Saladin. Albany: State University of New York Press. ISBN 0-87395-095-X.
- Halm, Heinz (2014). Kalifen und Assassinen: Ägypten und der vordere Orient zur Zeit der ersten Kreuzzüge, 1074–1171 [Caliphs and Assassins: Egypt and the Near East at the Time of the First Crusades, 1074–1171] (in German). Munich: C. H. Beck. doi:10.17104/9783406661648-1. ISBN 978-3-406-66163-1.
- Lev, Yaacov (1999). Saladin in Egypt. Leiden, Boston, Köln: Brill. ISBN 90-04-11221-9.
- Sajjadi, Sadeq; Daftary, Farhad; Umar, Suheyl (2008). "Al-ʿĀḍid". In Madelung, Wilferd; Daftary, Farhad (eds.). Encyclopaedia Islamica, Volume 3 (Adab – al-Bāb al-Ḥādī ͑ashar). Leiden & Boston: Brill. pp. 69–73. ISBN 978-90-04-16860-2.
- Saleh, Marlis J. (2009). "al-ʿĀḍid li-Dīn Allāh". In Fleet, Kate; Krämer, Gudrun; Matringe, Denis; Nawas, John; Rowson, Everett (eds.). Encyclopaedia of Islam (3rd ed.). Brill Online. doi:10.1163/1573-3912_ei3_COM_22734. ISSN 1873-9830.
- Şeşen, Ramazan (1988). "Âdıd-Lidînillâh". TDV Encyclopedia of Islam, Vol. 1 (Âb-ı Hayat – El-ahkâmü'ş-şer'i̇yye) (in Turkish). Istanbul: Presidency of Religious Affairs, Centre for Islamic Studies. pp. 374–375. ISBN 978-975-954-801-8.
- Wiet, G. (1960). "al-ʿĀḍid li-Dīn Allāh". In Gibb, H. A. R.; Kramers, J. H.; Lévi-Provençal, E.; Schacht, J.; Lewis, B. & Pellat, Ch. (eds.). The Encyclopaedia of Islam, Second Edition. Volume I: A–B. Leiden: E. J. Brill. pp. 196–197. doi:10.1163/1573-3912_islam_SIM_0311. OCLC 495469456.

Preceded by al-Fa'iz bi-Nasr Allah	Fatimid Caliph; 23 July 1160 – 13 September 1171	End of the Fatimid Caliphate; Saladin establishes the Ayyubid Sultanate
Preceded by al-Fa'iz bi-Nasr Allah	Imam of Hafizi Isma'ilism; 23 July 1160 – 13 September 1171	Succeeded by Daoud al-Hamid li-'llah
