= Kurds in Sudan =

Ethnic diaspora group

- (Kurdistan Region) (Sudan)

Total population
- 80,000-101,000

Languages
- Sudanese Arabic, Kurdish Kurmanji

Religion
- Mostly Islam, minority Christianity

Related ethnic groups
- Kurds, Sudanese Arabs

Kurds in Sudan (Kurdish: Kurdên li Sûdanê, Arabic: الأكراد في السودان) consists of individuals of Kurdish descent living within the country of Sudan. Their estimated population is approximately 80,000-101,000.

== History ==
Migration of Kurds in Sudan can be split into 5 parts. The first arrival of the Kurds in Sudan occurred during the reign of the Kurdish Sultan Salah al-Din al-Ayyubi. This event transpired following the decline of numerous revolts by Sudanese Nubian soldiers in Egypt, which were linked to their allegiance to the Fatimid state. In response to this situation, the Sultan dispatched his brother, Turan Shah, on a military campaign to Sudan. This campaign advanced from South Aswan and the city of Halfa towards the city of Alwa, which is presently situated within the boundaries of the Sudanese Capital Khartoum. However, Turan Shah discovered that the region lacked sufficient resources to warrant his prolonged presence, although a contingent of his soldiers chose to remain in the area. The Ayyubid Kurdish soldiers were distributed across a large part of Sudan. The towns referred to as "Kurdish" within the Kordofan region serve as crucial indicators of Kurdish settlement in Sudan.

== Second & Third wave ==
The second wave of immigration occurred during the era of the Ottoman Empire, particularly under Sultan Selim I. This development arose from a treaty established between the Sultan and the Kurdish princes, notably Mullah Îdrîs Bedlîsî, who served as a chief advisor to Selim. The Ottoman Empire consented to recognize the Kurdish leaders in exchange for military support and resources in the event of conflict, particularly in response to the threat posed by the Portuguese to the ports along the Indian Ocean and the Red Sea. As a result, Ottoman forces settled in the Swakin region, accompanied by Kurdish soldiers who participated in the Ottoman campaign. These soldiers subsequently dispersed to areas such as Shambat, Gedaref, and Port Sudan, with some advancing to Khartoum and Central Sudan. Additionally, The third wave of Kurds arrived with Muhammad Ali Pasha, a Kurdish leader from Amed, who recruited numerous men during his military campaigns in Sudan, many of whom chose not to return to their homeland.

== Fourth wave & Fifth wave ==
The fourth phase of Kurdish migration occurred following the collapse of the Kurdish September revolution. This period saw numerous politicians and military figures seeking refuge in Sudan due to fears of repression from the Iraqi authorities under Saddam Hussein after the revolution's failure. Among these leaders was Khalil Jabbari, a notable figure with both political and military acumen, who played a significant role in educating soldiers during the September revolution. The fifth wave of migration emerged in the aftermath of the Arab Spring, particularly following the exodus of some individuals from Assad regime after the revolution in Rojava. The Baath regime's decision to allow all Syrians to enter without a visa further incentivized many to migrate to Sudan.

== Economy ==
Consequently, Kurds came to dominate approximately 80 percent of the plastic trade in Sudan, engaging in agriculture and well-drilling. The techniques for well-drilling were introduced to Sudan by these Kurds, who established over 50 companies in this sector.

== See also ==
- Kurdish diaspora
- Kurdish refugees
- Demographics of Sudan
