= Moses of Makuria =

Moses
- King of Dotawo; King of the Alodians and Makurians (Note: His full imperial titulature is attested in a 1186 letter (DBMNT 610) as Μώσες Γεωργίου εὐσεβέστατος, φιλόχριστος, φιλεκκλήσιος, φιλόπτωχος, φιλάνθρωπος, φιλόξενος, ἀγαθός, πρᾶος, εὔσπλαγχνος, μεταδότης, ἀνδράγαθος, τροφεύς, φοβερότατος πάντων τῶν βαρβάρων βασιλεύς Ἀρουαδία καί Μακουρτία καί Νοβαδίον καί Δαμαλτία καί Ἁξιώμα καί αὐτοκράτωρος τοῦ λαοῦ ἐν τω Κυρίω ("Moses [Son] of George, the most pious, Christ-loving, Church-loving, loving the poor, lover of men, lover of strangers, good, mild, kind, generous, one who behaves uprightly, foster-father, the most fear-ful towards all barbarians, emperor of the Alodians, Makurians, Nobadians Ptolemais and Aksumites and autocrat of the people in the Lord).)
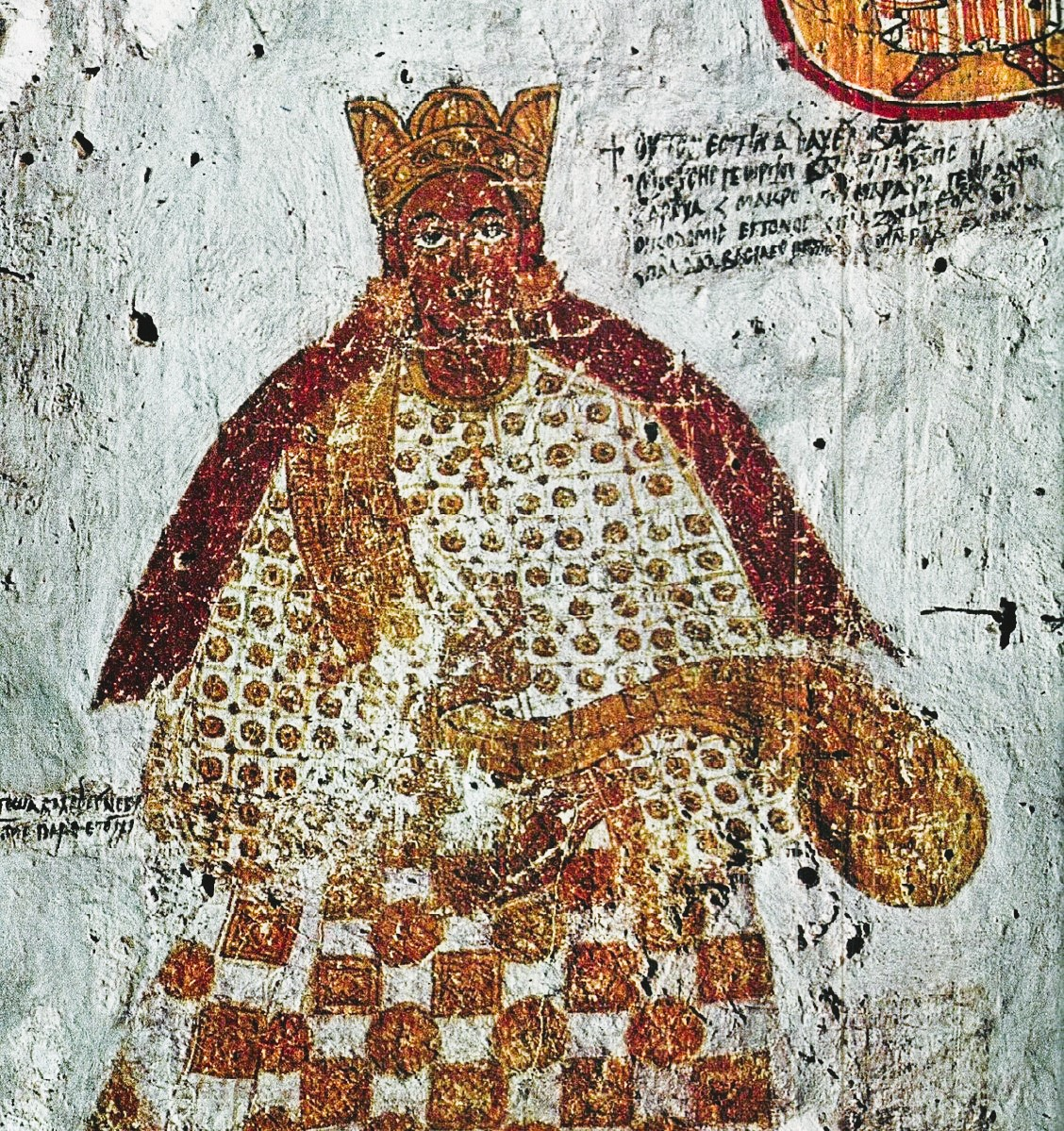
- Mural from Faras Cathedral depicting King Moses Georgios

King of Makuria
- Reign: 1155– c. 1198
- Predecessor: Georgios V
- Successor: Georgios VI

King of Alodia
- Reign: c. 1170?– c. 1198
- Predecessor: Paulos
- Born: c. 1130
- Died: c. 1203
- Father: Paulos
- Mother: Maria
- Religion: Coptic Orthodox Christianity

Moses (Old Nubian: ⲙⲟⲩⲥⲏⲥ, Mousēs or Mousis) was a 12th-century ruler of the Nubian kingdoms of Makuria and Alodia. During his reign it is believed that the crown of Alodia was also under the control of Makuria. He is mostly known for his conflict with Saladin. He is frequently mistakenly identified as 'Moses Georgiou' or 'Moses Georgios' from the Nubians' occasional use of genitive forms from Greek name lists as religious or given names.

== Life and reign ==
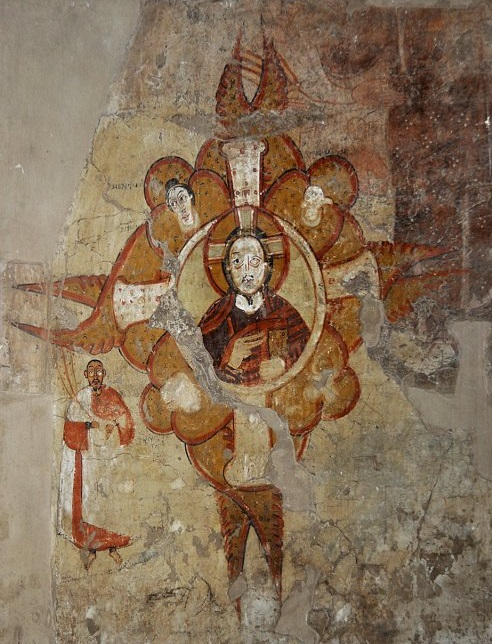
Ruins of the Central Church of Abdallah Nirqi

Moses was born around 1130, the son of king Paul of Alodia and Maria, sister of Georgios V, king of Makuria. At the time of his birth, the two kingdoms were in a personal union, and according to traditional Nubian matrilineal succession, Moses was heir apparent to his uncle Georgios. When Georgios retired to Egypt in 1154, Moses was serving his father as eparch of Palaga, and thus his cousin David was able to take the Makurian throne. With the support of his father and the Fatimids, Moses was able to overthrow David and become king of Makuria, ostensibly alongside Georgios before his death in 1157/1158. At some unknown time before 1186, Moses succeeded his father as king of Alodia and made his own nephew Georgios VI co-king in Makuria.

In 1171, the Ayyubids overthrew the Fatimid Caliphate, whose capital was Cairo. This brought Makuria and the Ayyubids into conflict with each other. The following year, a Makurian army pillaged Aswan and advanced even further north. It is not clear if this campaign was intended to aid the Fatimids or was merely a raid exploiting the unstable situation in Egypt, although the latter seems more likely, as the Makurians apparently soon withdrew.

To deal with the Nubians, Saladin sent his brother Turan-Shah. The latter conquered Qasr Ibrim in January 1173, reportedly sacking it, taking many prisoners, pillaging the church, and converting it into a mosque. Afterward, he sent an emissary to King Moses, intending to answer a previously requested peace treaty with a pair of arrows.

Moses was said to have branded an Ayyubid emissary's hand with the mark of the cross. Turan-Shah withdrew from Nubia but left a detachment of Kurdish troops in Qasr Ibrim, which would raid Lower Nubia for the next two years. Archaeological evidence links them with the destruction of the Faras Cathedral, the Central Church of Abdallah Nirqi, and Debeira West.

In 1175, a Nubian army finally arrived to confront the invaders at Adindan. Before battle, however, the Kurdish commander Ibrahim al-Kurdi drowned while crossing the Nile, resulting in the retreat of Saladin's troops out of Nubia. Afterwards, there was peace for another 100 years in which Makuria had independence over Nubia while Aswan was reoccupied by the Ayyubids and a garrison of Kurdish soldiers was stationed there.

Moses has been identified as the "king of Nubia" encountered by the crusaders in Constantinople in 1203 who wished to travel to Rome before retiring to Jerusalem.

== Sources ==
- Adams, William Y. (1977). Nubia: Corridor to Africa. Princeton: Princeton University. ISBN 978-0-7139-0579-3.
- Lajtar, Adam (2009). "Varia Nubica XII-XIX" (PDF). The Journal of Juristic Papyrology (in German). XXXIX: 83–119. ISSN 0075-4277.
- Łajtar, Adam and Ochała, Grzegorz. "A Christian King in Africa: The Image of Christian Nubian Rulers in Internal and External Sources," in P. Forness, A. Hasse-Ungeheuer and H. Leppin (eds.) The Good Christian Ruler in the First Millenium: Views from the Wider Mediterranean World in Conversation. De Gruyter 2021(Millenium Studies 92).
- Plumley, J. Martin (1983). "Qasr Ibrim and Islam". Études et Travaux. XII: 157–170.
- Plumley, J. Martin. “New Light on the Kingdom of Dotawo”, in Études nubiennes. Colloque de Chantilly, 2 – 6 juillet 1975. Cairo 1978 (Bibliothèque d’étude 77).
- Ruffini, Giovanni R. (2012). Medieval Nubia. A Social and Economic History. Oxford University.
- Welsby, Derek (2002). The Medieval Kingdoms of Nubia. Pagans, Christians and Muslims along the Middle Nile. The British Museum. ISBN 0714119474.
- Werner, Roland (2013). Das Christentum in Nubien. Geschichte und Gestalt einer afrikanischen Kirche. Lit.
