= Siege of Alexandria (1174) =

Sicilian invasion of Egypt

- Part of the Crusades
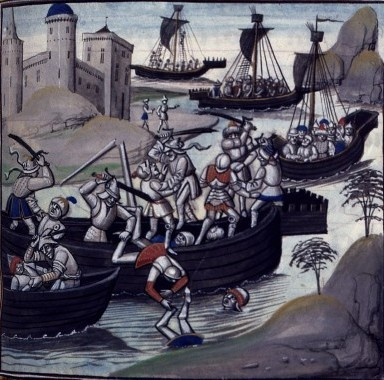
- Crusader siege of Alexandria
Date	28 July – 2 August 1174
Location	Alexandria
Result	Ayyubid victory

Belligerents
Ayyubid Sultanate	Kingdom of Sicily

Commanders and leaders
Saladin	Tancred of Lecce (surrendered)

Strength
Unknown	30,000 men 1,500 knights 280 ships

Casualties and losses
Unknown	Heavy

The siege of Alexandria in 1174 was a short-lived and unsuccessful attempt by the Normans of Sicily to overthrow Saladin in Egypt.

== Background ==
After Saladin abolished the Fatimid Caliphate in 1171, Fatimid sympathizers began plotting against Saladin; a conspiracy included former Fatimid officials, former Fatimid Black African troops, and the poet Umara al-Yamani. The conspirators reportedly called for aid from the Crusaders of the Kingdom of Jerusalem and the Normans of the Kingdom of Sicily. However, Saladin was able to crack down on the conspirators and punish them. Umara was crucified on 6 April 1174, and the Egyptians and Black Africans were exiled to Upper Egypt.

The expected assistance from Saladin's enemies did not materialize due to the death of King Amalric of Jerusalem, and the news of the plot's failure. However, the Normans of Sicily called for their aid despite being unaware of the plot's failure.

== Siege ==
Under the command of his cousin, Tancred of Lecce, William II sent out a fleet of 280 ships, 30,000 soldiers, and 1,500 knights. On July 28, they arrived in Alexandria. The garrison was caught completely off guard. The Normans began to attack the city walls with siege towers, mangonels, and catapults, and the defenders were forced to repel the attack until nightfall. The following day, the Normans moved their siege artillery closer to the city walls and continued the attack, but the defenders were able to repel it thanks to reinforcements from nearby villages.

After the defenders launched daring sorties on July 31 and August 1 that destroyed the Norman siege engines and killed many besiegers, the garrison withdrew inside the walls. Meanwhile, The Normans received word that Saladin was advancing on the city with his army to relieve it. These reports boosted the garrison's morale, and they mounted a nighttime sortie that drove the Normans to their ships and out to sea. The Normans left the city on August 2 and returned home.

== Sources ==
- Stanley Lane-Poole, Saladin and the fall of the Kingdom of Jerusalem.
- Geoffrey Hindley, Saladin : hero of Islam.
- Michael S. Fulton, Artillery in the Era of the Crusades, Siege Warfare and the Development of Trebuchet Technology.
- Thomas F. Madden, The New Concise History of the Crusades.
- Hervin Fernández Aceves, County and Nobility in Norman Italy, Aristocratic Agency in the Kingdom of Sicily, 1130–1189.
- Bernard Hamilton, The Leper King and His Heirs, Baldwin IV and the Crusader Kingdom of Jerusalem.
