= Banafsha bint Abdullah al-Rumiyyah =

Umm walad of Abbasid Caliph Al-Mustadi

Banafsha bint Abdullah al-Rumiyyah بانفشة بنت عبد الله الرمية

Umm walad of the Abbasid caliph
- Period: 1170 – 1180
- Died: 1201; Baghdad, Abbasid Caliphate
- Burial: Sheikh Maarouf Cemetery, Baghdad
- Spouse: Al-Mustadi
- Relatives: One daughter Al-Nasir (step-son)
Names
- Sayyida Banafsha bint Abdullah al-Rumiyyah
- Father: Abdullah al-Rumi
- Religion: Sunni Islam
- Occupation: The founder of the Hanbali Banafsha School in Baghdad (1174).; She built a bridge between the Karkh and Al-Rusafa districts in Baghdad.

Banafsha bint Abdullah al-Rumiyyah (Arabic: بنفشة بنت عبد الله الرمية) (died 1201) was a slave consort of the Abbasid caliph Al-Mustadi (r. 1170–1180).

Her origin is termed to have been "Roman" or Rumiyya, that is to say of Greek origin from the Byzantine Empire of Constantinople. She was reportedly the daughter of a Greek, and called "bint Abdullah" ("daughter of Abdullah") since slave women and daughters of non-Muslim fathers were normally referred to with this patronymicon. She was a slave brought to the Harem of the Caliph. As was the custom she was compelled to convert to Islam and was given a new name.

She became Al-Mustadi's favourite concubine. The Caliph manumitted her and married her. He had a palace built for her personal use in Baghdad.

Banafsha is described as loving and merciful. She did not give birth to a son, but she successfully supported her stepson Al-Nasir to the succession before his brother prince Hashem. Because of this, she was favored by Al-Nasir when he became Caliph in 1180.

It was impossible for her to leave the harem, but she became known for her donations and charitable projects, which was a common method for the secluded harem wives of the Caliphs to create a public name for themselves. She was considered a powerful woman in her court and kingdom. She died on 27 December 1201 and was buried in the mausoleum of Zumurrud Khatun in Sheikh Maarouf Cemetery.

She is known as the founder of the Hanbali Banafsha School in Baghdad (1174). She also built a bridge between the Karkh and Al-Rusafa districts in Baghdad.
