= Turan-Shah's Nubian campaign =

1173 conflict in Upper Egypt

Date	January 1173
Location	Upper Egypt
Result	Ayyubid victory
Territorial changes	Ayyubids annex Qasr Ibrim

Belligerents
Ayyubid Sultanate	Makuria

Commanders and leaders
Turan-Shah; Husam al-Din Abu'l-Hayja; Ibrahim al-Kurdi; Kanz al-Dawla	Moses Georgios of Makuria

Units involved
Al-Mihraniyya; Al-Salahiyya; Banu Kanz	Kurdish forces

Turan-Shah's Nubian campaign took place in 1173, between the Nubians of Upper Egypt and the Kurdish forces of the Ayyubid commander, Turan-Shah.

== Background ==
The Nubians and Egyptians had long been engaged in a series of skirmishes along the border region of their two countries in Upper Egypt. After the Fatimids were deposed, tensions rose as Nubian raids against Egyptian border towns grew bolder, culminating in the siege of Aswan by former Black Fatimid soldiers in late 1172 to early 1173. The governor of Aswan, Kanz al-Dawla, a former Fatimid official, requested military assistance from Saladin, which he agreed to send.

== Conquest of Nubia ==
The Ayyubid response began when Saladin dispatched Turanshah with a force of Kurdish troops to relieve Aswan, but the Nubian soldiers had already departed. Nonetheless, Turanshah conquered the Nubian town of Ibrim and gave the fiefdom (iqta') to his Kurdish commander, Ibrahim al-Kurdi. Turanshah followed up on this by conducting a series of raids against the Nubians. His attacks appear to have been highly successful, resulting in the Nubian king based in Dongola, to request an armistice. Apparently eager for conquest, Turanshah was unwilling to accept the offer until his own emissary had visited the King of Nubia and reported that the entire country was poor and not worth occupying. Although the Ayyubids would be forced to take future actions against the Nubians, Turanshah set his sights on more lucrative territories. He acquired considerable wealth in Egypt after his campaign against Nubia, bringing many Nubian and Christian slaves back with him.

== Aftermath ==
In 1174, Kanz al-Dawla, launched an insurrection against the Ayyubids to restore the Fatimids. He gained the support of other Arab tribes in the region and the African regiments and sought to join the revolt of Abbas ibn Shadi, the leader of the Arab tribes in Middle Egypt. Before the Banu Kanz could link with Abbas, Saladin's forces under Abu'l-Hayja's command defeated and killed Abbas. The Ayyubid army proceeded to confront the Banu Kanz, who were defeated after major clashes in Aswan. Ibn al-Mutawwaj was eventually captured and executed in the aftermath of his army's defeat.

== See also ==
- Ayyubid dynasty
- Nubia
- Turan-Shah
