= Daoud ibn al-Adid =

25th imam of Hafizi Isma'ilism from 1171 to 1207/8

Daoud al-Hamid li-llah

Imam of Hafizi Isma'ilism
- In office 1171 — 1207/8
- Preceded by: Al-Adid li-Din Allah (as Fatimid caliph)
- Succeeded by: Sulayman Badr al-Din

Personal life
- Born: Daoud ibn al-Adid; Cairo
- Died: 1207/8; Cairo
- Children: Sulayman ibn Daoud
- Parent: Al-Adid li-Din Allah (father)

Religious life
- Religion: Shi'a Islam
- Sect: Hafizi Isma'ilism

Daoud ibn al-Adid (also spelled Dawud and Da'ud; Arabic: داود بن العاضد, romanized: Dāwūd ibn al-ʿĀḍid), known by the regnal name of al-Ḥāmid liʾllāh (الحامد لله) among his followers, was the 25th imam of Hafizi Isma'ilism, and pretender to the Fatimid Caliphate.

Daoud was the oldest son of the last Fatimid caliph, al-Adid. When al-Adid died in 1171, Daoud was a child. He was not allowed to succeed to the throne by the all-powerful vizier, Saladin, who inaugurated his own Ayyubid regime instead. Like the rest of his family, Daoud spent the rest of his life until his death in 1207/8 in captivity, despite occasional revolts and conspiracies by Fatimid sympathizers. He is reported to have had a son, Sulayman Badr al-Din, conceived in secret, who became the last Hafizi imam.

== Life ==
Daoud was the oldest son of the last Fatimid caliph, al-Adid li-Din Allah (r. 1160–1171). Like his immediate predecessors, al-Adid would be little more than a figurehead monarch, effectively a puppet in the hands of courtiers and strongmen who disputed with one another over the spoils of the tottering Fatimid regime. The last and most notable of these strongmen was Saladin, who became vizier and the de facto ruler of Egypt in March 1169.

=== Fall of the Fatimid Caliphate ===
Under pressure from his Syrian overlord, Nur al-Din, Saladin began to undermine the religious foundations of the Fatimid regime, undermining Fatimid-sponsored Hafizi Isma'ilism and restoring Sunni supremacy in Egypt. This culminated on 10 September 1171, when the Shafi'i jurist Najm al-Din al-Khabushani publicly proclaimed the name of the Sunni Abbasid caliph, al-Mustadi, instead of al-Adid's, and read out a list of the Fatimids' crimes. When al-Adid died a few days later, on 13 September 1171, Saladin proclaimed the Fatimid caliphate as abolished. Officially, according to the medieval Egyptian historian al-Maqrizi, this was because al-Adid had failed to designate Daoud (an infant at the time) as heir (wali al-ahd).

The new Ayyubid regime placed the numerous Fatimid clan—the contemporary official Qadi al-Fadil places the total at 252, 98 men and 154 women—under house arrest in the palace of Barjawan, under the supervision of Saladin's trusted chamberlain, Baha al-Din Qaraqush. Their enormous treasures were divided among Saladin and Nur al-Din, and the famous Fatimid libraries were split up and sold or confiscated by Saladin's officials. Saladin persecuted the remaining Isma'ili faithful, many of whom fled to Upper Egypt.

=== Life in captivity ===
Daoud remained in captivity, but his followers still recognized him as their imam, with the regnal title of al-Hamid li'llah, lit. 'He who praises God'. An abortive pro-Fatimid conspiracy among senior officials was discovered in April 1174, during which some of the conspirators are recorded having favoured appointing one of his adult cousins as caliph instead. A pro-Fatimid uprising followed in late summer of the same year in Upper Egypt. It was supported by the hereditary governor of Aswan, Kanz al-Dawla, but suppressed in early September by Saladin's brother, al-Adil. Another pro-Fatimid uprising occurred in 1176, in the name of Daoud, or by an Isma'ili missionary claiming to be Daoud, at Qift in Upper Egypt. Al-Adil again went to suppress the new revolt and executed as many as 3,000 locals in reprisals.

By 1188, however, an attempted uprising in Cairo by a small group who called out the Shi'a battle-cry "Family of Ali" during the night found no response from the people of the Egyptian capital. In 1207/8, the Fatimid prisoners were moved to the Cairo Citadel. Daoud died in the same year. His followers received permission from al-Adil, by then the sultan of Egypt, to mourn him in public, but the sultan used the occasion to arrest their leaders and confiscate their property.

== Heirs and aftermath ==
Despite the separation of male and female prisoners, Daoud apparently managed to beget two sons, reportedly with slave women secretly smuggled into his chambers. The mother of the eldest, Sulayman, surnamed Badr al-Din, was then smuggled to Upper Egypt, where her son was born. It was only later, likely under al-Adil's son and successor, al-Kamil (r. 1218–1238), that Sulayman was captured and confined in the Cairo Citadel. Sulayman ibn Daoud died in 1248, apparently childless, thus ending the direct Fatimid line. Some Isma'ili partisans claimed that he had a son who was hidden—repeating the common motif of the 'Hidden Imam'. As late as 1298, a pretender claiming to be the son of Sulayman ibn Daoud, and also called himself Daoud appeared in Upper Egypt, but by this time the Isma'ilis had been reduced to small isolated enclaves, the last traces of which are recorded in the 14th century.

== Sources ==
- Brett, Michael (2017). The Fatimid Empire. The Edinburgh History of the Islamic Empires. Edinburgh: Edinburgh University Press. doi:10.1515/9781474421515. ISBN 978-0-7486-4076-8.
- Daftary, Farhad (2007). The Ismāʿı̄lı̄s: Their History and Doctrines (Second ed.). Cambridge: Cambridge University Press. ISBN 978-0-521-61636-2.
- Halm, Heinz (2014). Kalifen und Assassinen: Ägypten und der vordere Orient zur Zeit der ersten Kreuzzüge, 1074–1171 [Caliphs and Assassins: Egypt and the Near East at the Time of the First Crusades, 1074–1171] (in German). Munich: C. H. Beck. doi:10.17104/9783406661648-1. ISBN 978-3-406-66163-1. OCLC 870587158.
- Saleh, Marlis J. (2009). "al-ʿĀḍid li-Dīn Allāh". In Fleet, Kate; Krämer, Gudrun; Matringe, Denis; Nawas, John; Rowson, Everett (eds.). Encyclopaedia of Islam (3rd ed.). Brill Online. doi:10.1163/1573-3912_ei3_COM_22734. ISSN 1873-9830.
- Walker, Paul E. (1995). "Succession to Rule in the Shiite Caliphate". Journal of the American Research Center in Egypt. 32: 239–264. doi:10.2307/40000841. JSTOR 40000841.

Shia Islam titles
Preceded by al-Adid li-Din Allah	25th Imam of Hafizi Isma'ilism; 13 September 1171 – 1207/8	Succeeded by Sulayman Badr al-Din
