= Zayn al-Din Ali ibn Naja =

Zayn al-Din Abu'l-Hasan Ali ibn Naja was a Sunni Muslim preacher and close friend of Saladin.

Born in Damascus, Zayn al-Din was a jurist who belonged to the Hanbali school of Sunni Islam. In 1164, he participated in negotiations between Saladin's uncle Shirkuh, and Sunni Egyptian jurists on the overthrow of the Isma'ili Fatimid Caliphate.

According to some accounts, he was involved in, and betrayed, a conspiracy aimed against Saladin by Fatimid sympathizers in 1174, although it is possible that he acted all along as Saladin's agent and agent provocateur. He reportedly received all possessions and treasure of one of the ringleaders, the Isma'ili missionary (da'i) and former chief qadi of the Fatimid Caliphate, Hibatallah ibn Kamil al-Mufaddal, as a reward.

After the capture of Jerusalem from the Crusaders in 1187, Saladin chose Zayn al-Din to be one of the first to hold prayers there.

== Sources ==
- Ehrenkreutz, Andrew S. (1972). Saladin. Albany, NY: State University of New York Press. ISBN 0-87395-095-X.
- Halm, Heinz (2014). Kalifen und Assassinen: Ägypten und der vordere Orient zur Zeit der ersten Kreuzzüge, 1074–1171 [Caliphs and Assassins: Egypt and the Near East at the Time of the First Crusades, 1074–1171] (in German). Munich: C. H. Beck. doi:10.17104/9783406661648-1. ISBN 978-3-406-66163-1.
- Lyons, Malcolm Cameron; Jackson, D. E. P. (1982). Saladin: The Politics of the Holy War. Cambridge: Cambridge University Press. ISBN 0-521-31739-8.
