= Sulayman ibn Daoud =

26th and last leader of Hafizi Isma'ilism

Imam of Hafizi Isma'ilism
- In office 1207/8 — 1248
- Preceded by: Daoud al-Hamid li-llah

Personal life
- Born: Upper Egypt
- Died: 1248 Cairo, Ayyubid Sultanate
- Parent: Daoud al-Hamid li-llah (father)

Religious life
- Religion: Shi'a Islam
- Sect: Hafizi Isma'ilism

Sulaymān ibn Dāwūd (Arabic: سليمان بن داوود), known by the regnal name of Badr al-Dīn (بدر الدين) among the Isma'ili faithful, was the 26th and last imam of Hafizi Isma'ilism. Like his father, he spent most of his life in captivity at the hands of the Ayyubid government. He died apparently childless, thereby ending the line of Hafizi imams.

== Life ==
The Fatimid Caliphate was abolished by Saladin in 1171. In the aftermath, Saladin and his Ayyubid successors imprisoned the surviving members of the Fatimid dynasty, including the heir-apparent, Daoud ibn al-Adid, who was still recognized by the Hafizi Isma'ili faithful as their rightful imam. A series of pro-Fatimid conspiracies and uprisings in the 1170s failed to topple the new Ayyubid regime, and Daoud spent his life in prison, until his death in 1207–8.

Despite the separation of male and female prisoners, Daoud apparently managed to beget two sons, reportedly with slave women secretly smuggled into his chambers. Sulayman, given the epithet Badr al-Din (lit. 'Full Moon of the Faith') by his followers, was the oldest. As soon as his mother had conceived him, she was reportedly smuggled to Upper Egypt, where pro-Fatimid sentiment lingered, and where her son was born. Later, likely under the Ayyubid sultan al-Kamil (r. 1218–1238), Sulayman was captured and confined in the Cairo Citadel, where the rest of the surviving Fatimid clan was being held as well.

Sulayman died in 1248, apparently childless, thus ending the direct Fatimid line. Some Isma'ili partisans claimed that he had a son who was hidden, repeating the common motif of the 'Hidden Imam'. As late as 1298, a pretender claiming to be Daoud, the son of Sulayman, appeared in Upper Egypt, but by this time the Isma'ilis had been reduced to small isolated enclaves, the last traces of which disappear in the 14th century.

== Sources ==
- Daftary, Farhad (2007). The Ismāʿı̄lı̄s: Their History and Doctrines (Second ed.). Cambridge: Cambridge University Press. ISBN 978-0-521-61636-2.
- Halm, Heinz (2014). Kalifen und Assassinen: Ägypten und der vordere Orient zur Zeit der ersten Kreuzzüge, 1074–1171 [Caliphs and Assassins: Egypt and the Near East at the Time of the First Crusades, 1074–1171] (in German). Munich: C. H. Beck. doi:10.17104/9783406661648-1. ISBN 978-3-406-66163-1. OCLC 870587158.

Shia Islam titles
Preceded by Daoud ibn al-Adid	26th Imam of Hafizi Isma'ilism; 1207/8–1248	Died childless End of the line of Hafizi imams
