= Battle of al-Babein =

1167 battle in Egypt during the Crusades

Coordinates: 30°01′N 31°13′E

Battle of Giza
- Part of the Crusades
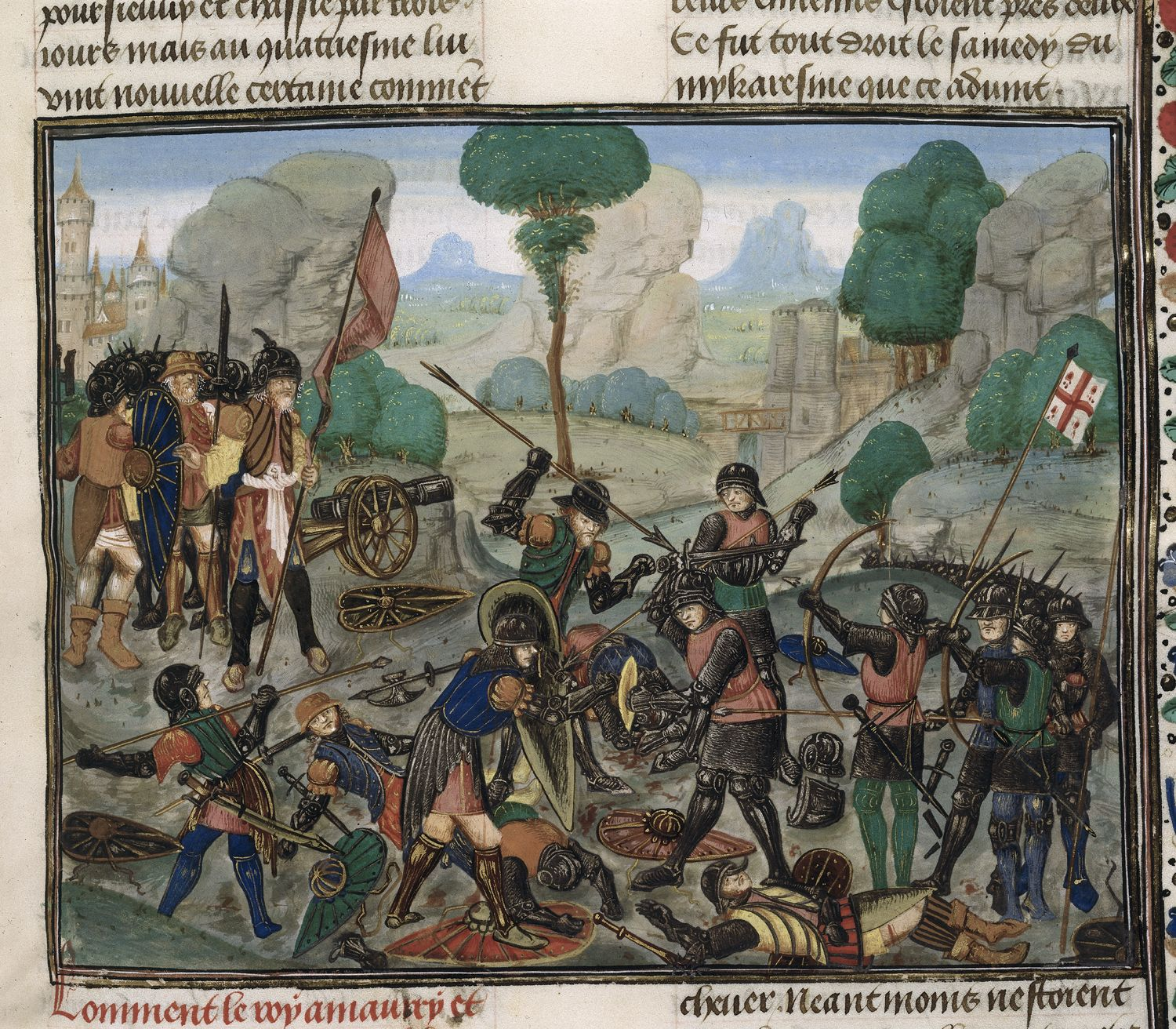
- Detail of a miniature of a battle between Amaury and Siracon (Shirkuh).
Date	March 18, 1167
Location	Giza, Egypt
Result	Zengid victory

Belligerents
Kingdom of Jerusalem	Zengid Dynasty

Commanders and leaders
Amalric I of Jerusalem	Shirkuh; Saladin

Strength
374 knights, some horse archers and tens of thousands (10,000+) Latin Crusader	2,000

Casualties and losses
100+ knights	Unknown

The Battle of al-Babein took place on March 18, 1167, during the third Crusader invasion of Egypt. King Amalric I of Jerusalem, and a Zengid army under Shirkuh, both hoped to take the control of Egypt over from the Fatimid Caliphate. Saladin served as Shirkuh’s highest-ranking officer in the battle. The result was a tactical draw between the forces, however the Crusaders failed to gain access to Egypt.

== Background ==
After the death of Zengi, his son, Nur al-Din came to power in Aleppo. In 1154, he gained control of Damascus when there was no one in power over the city. He became the first Seljuq leader since the 1090s to unite north and south Syria. Nur al-Din embraced jihad ideals when battling against the Franks and was a crucial figure in the recovery of Jerusalem.

Vizier Shawar had full authority over the Fatimids and was the advisor to the caliph. Shawar required the support of Nur al-Din’s generals to gain control. Shawar turned to Shirkuh for assistance. After Shawar found out Shirkuh’s price for fighting for him was higher than he was willing to pay, Shawar turned to Amalric. Shirkuh was almost ready to establish territory of his own in Egypt when Amalric I invaded. After several months of campaigning, Shrikuh was forced to withdraw.

Shirkuh had the ability to conduct politics and aspired to become Nur al-Din’s right-hand man. Shirkuh fought in the Battle of Inab in 1149. He had killed Raymond of Antioch in the battle fighting one-on-one with him. After that battle, he gained his reputation for his attention to detail and his excellence with tactics. When Nur al-Din captured Damascus in 1154, he sent Shirkuh before the ambassadors to negotiate the terms for the border lines between Damascus and Aleppo.

Amalric I was the king of Jerusalem, and held power from 1163 to 1174. Amalric had been an ally and nominal protector for the Fatimid government. In 1167, Amalric wanted to destroy the Zengid army sent by Nur al-Din from Syria. Amalric depended on his Military Orders for his invasion of Egypt. The Military Orders is a Christian order of Knighthood. The Military Orders were set down for the Knights Hospitaller and the Knights Templar to go against pagans or Muslims, or in the Holy Lands, to anyone who persecuted the Christian beliefs and practices. Amalric’s obsession was to take over Egypt, after first trying to befriend the nation. Later on, he decided to serve under Saladin after he declared himself sultan in 1171.

Another key participant in the battle of al-Babein was Saladin. Saladin entered the army at the age of 14. At age of 18, he was promoted to personal officer to Nur al-Din. At first Saladin was reluctant to go with his uncle, Shirkuh, to take over Egypt. Saladin only agreed to this because Shirkuh was family. He took thousands of troops, his bodyguards, and 200,000 gold pieces to Egypt, to take over the nation.

Because Amalric was an ally and protector of the Fatimid government, fighting in the Battle of al-Babein was in his best interest. He invaded Egypt several times during his reign. These campaigns were not very successful, as they always ran into complications leading to failure each time. Nur al-Din organized the battle strategy on the Muslim side. Nur al-Din was the Muslim leader who unified Syria. The troops were led by Shirkuh. Since both sides wanted to be in charge of Egypt, whoever won the battle would accomplish that goal. This contest brought on the Battle of al-Babein in 1167.

== Battle ==
King Amalric ordered only his mounted forces to chase Shirkuh and the Muslims out of Egypt at the beginning of the battle. Amalric chased Shirkuh’s troops up the valley of the Nile and across the river to Giza. The chase almost worked, but the Muslims turned to fight Amalric where the cultivated ground ended and the desert began. The steep slopes and soft sand reduced the effectiveness of the Latin army. King Amalric I’s army was weakened because he only took a handful of men with him to pursue Shirkuh. He commanded 374 armed Frankish horsemen along with the mounted archers known as Turcopoles. The Christian knights also sided with Amalric I in order to go after Shirkuh’s army.

Shirkuh came up with a plan to draw the Franks, along with Amalric, away from the battlefield. Shirkuh’s plan was for the Latin cavalry charge to find no worthy target. Shirkuh hoped to lessen the severity of the fight. He wanted the Franks to think that all his best men were in the center surrounding him. Among those in the center line was Saladin, Shirkuh’s nephew. Saladin, under Shrikuh’s orders, was to retreat once the Franks moved closer.

Amalric fell for Shirkuh’s plan. Amalric sent his main attack toward the center of Shirkuh’s troops. Saladin then drew Amalric and the Franks away from the battlefield. The fight broke off into smaller skirmishes. Some of the skirmishes were won by the Franks and others by the Turks.

When Amalric returned from pursuing Saladin, he rallied his troops together. Amalric lined up his troops and marched straight through the enemy lines, fighting all enemy opposition along the way. Amalric then marched off the battlefield with his army. Neither side left with a victory. The Franks lost one hundred knights and failed to destroy Shrikuh’s army. This also cost Amalric’s chance to become the ruler of Egypt.

== Literature ==
- Baldwin, Marshall W. A History of The Crusades. Volume 1. (Madison, The University of Wisconsin Press, 1969), 553, 385.
- Hindley, Geoffrey. (New York, Harper & Row Publishers, Inc.), 149-159.
- Jotischky, Andrew. Crusading and the Crusader States. (Edinburgh Gate, Pearson Education Limited, 2004), 83-93.
- Smail, R.C. Crusading Warfare (1097–1193). (New York, The Cambridge University Press, 1956), 183-185.
- Tyerman, Christopher. Fighting for Christendom: Holy War and the Crusades. (New York, Oxford University Press, 2004), 149, 166.
