= Al-Mustadi =

Abbasid Caliph in Baghdad (r. 1170–1180)

al-Hassan al-Mustadi الحسن المستضيء بأمر الله
- Khalīfah; Amir al-Mu'minin
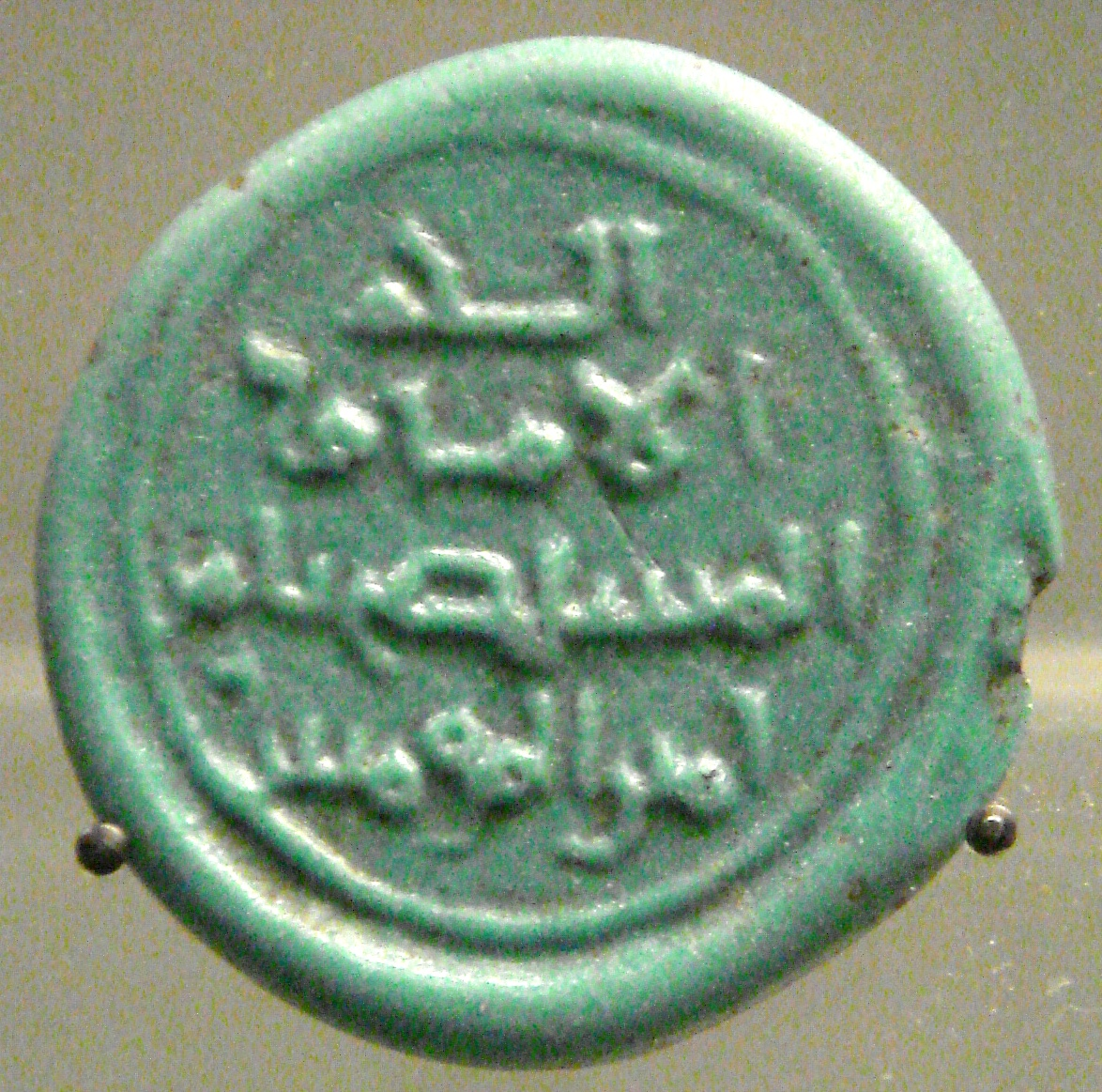
- Turquoise glass stamp of al-Mustadi

33rd Caliph of the Abbasid Caliphate Abbasid Caliph in Baghdad
- Reign: 18 December 1170 – 27 March 1180
- Predecessor: al-Mustanjid
- Successor: al-Nasir
- Born: 1142; Baghdad, Abbasid Caliphate
- Died: 27 March 1180 (aged 38); Baghdad, Abbasid Caliphate
- Consort: Sayyida Zumurrud; Sayyida Banafsha; Sharaf Khatun; Khtalj Khatun al-Abbasah
- Issue: Al-Nasir; Hashim
Names
- Abu Muhammad al-Hasan ibn Yusuf al-Mustanjid al-Mustadi
- Dynasty: Abbasid
- Father: al-Mustanjid
- Mother: Ghaddha
- Religion: Sunni Islam

Abu Muhammad Hasan ibn Yusuf al-Mustanjid (Arabic: أبو محمد حسن بن يوسف المستنجد; 1142 – 27 March 1180), usually known by his regnal title al-Mustadi (Arabic: المستضيء بأمر الله), was the Abbasid caliph in Baghdad from 1170 to 1180. He succeeded his father al-Mustanjid.

== Early life ==
Al-Mustadi was the son of caliph al-Mustanjid and his mother was Ghaddha, an Armenian concubine. He was born in 1142. His full name was Hasan ibn Yusuf al-Mustanjid and his Kunya was Abu Muhammad. He was named after 5th caliph al-Hasan.

As a young Abbasid prince, Hasan spend his youth in Baghdad and received good education. He also fathered children his elder son was Ahmad (future Al-Nasir) by a Turkic umm walad called Zumurrud (the meaning of her name was Emerald). She was a pious and religious woman. When his father al-Mustanjid died on 18 December 1170, he succeeded him.

== Reign ==
Al-Mustadi's reign is generally remembered for its significant focus on construction and public works. He is believed to have rebuilt the al-Taj Palace in Baghdad, which had originally been constructed by the 10th-century Abbasid caliph al-Muktafi (r. 902–908). During his rule, numerous mosques, schools, and religious endowments were also established. His two wives, Sayyida Banafsha and Zumurrud Khatun, played an especially active role in supporting these charitable and construction activities. Banafsha, who followed the Hanbali school of thought, ordered the construction of a bridge in Baghdad in 570 AH (1174 CE), which later became known by her name.

Like his predecessor, he continued to occupy a more or less independent position, with a vizier and courtly surroundings, and supported by only a small force sufficient for an occasional local campaign. During his reign, Saladin ended the Shia Fatimid Caliphate, became the Sultan of Egypt and declared his allegiance to the Abbasids.

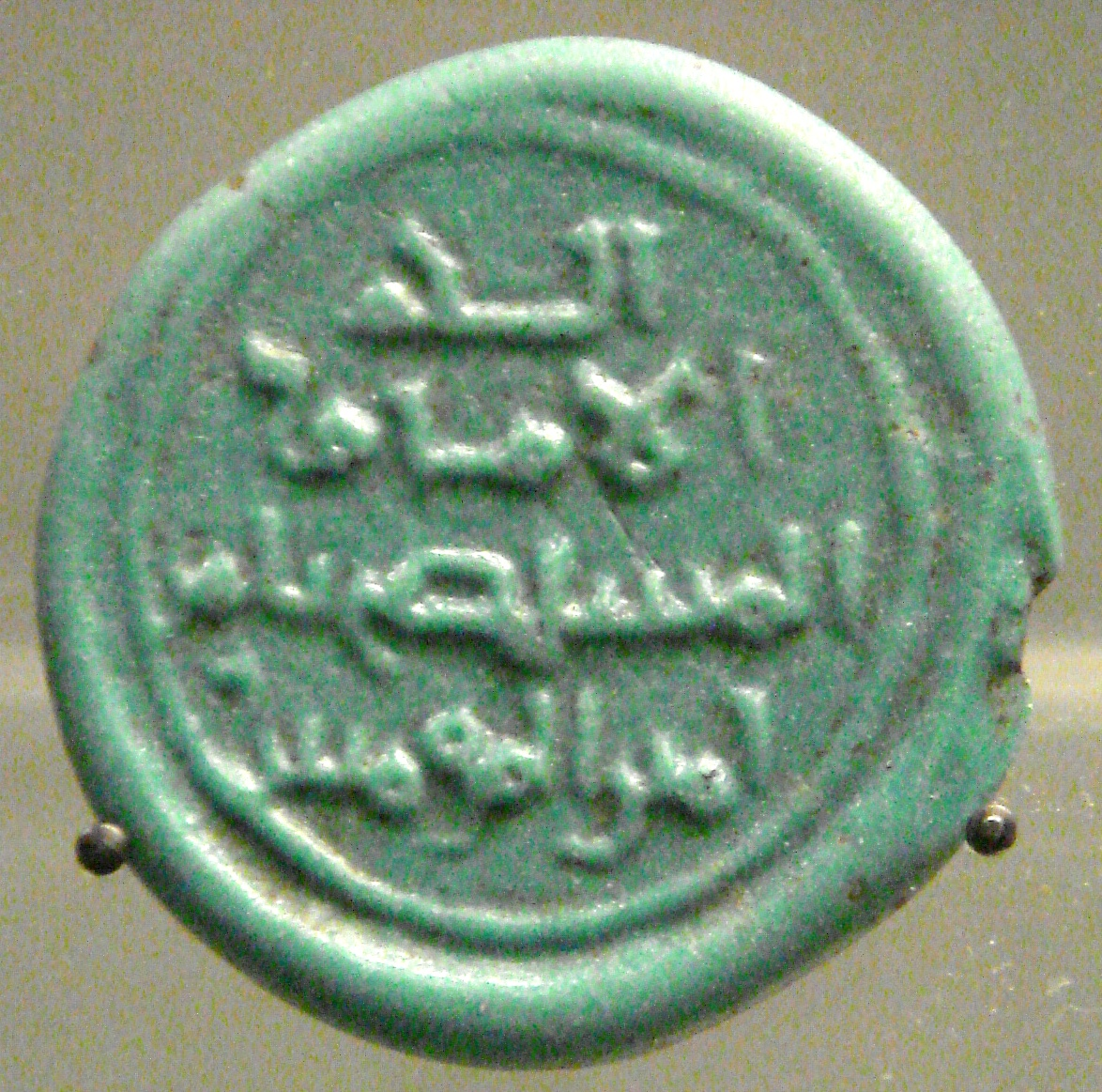
Turquoise glass stamp of caliph al-Mustadi, 1170–1180. British Museum.

Towards the end of 1169, Saladin, with reinforcements from Nur ad-Din, defeated a massive Crusader-Byzantine force near Damietta. Afterward, in the spring of 1170, Nur ad-Din sent Saladin's father to Egypt in compliance with Saladin's request, as well as encouragement from the Baghdad-based Abbasid caliph, al-Mustanjid, who aimed to pressure Saladin in deposing his rival caliph, al-Adid. Saladin himself had been strengthening his hold on Egypt and widening his support base there. He began granting his family members high-ranking positions in the region; he ordered the construction of a college for the Maliki branch of Sunni Islam in the city, as well as one for the Shafi'i denomination to which he belonged in al-Fustat.

After establishing himself in Egypt, Saladin launched a campaign against the Crusaders, besieging Darum in 1170. Amalric withdrew his Templar garrison from Gaza to assist him in defending Darum, but Saladin evaded their force and captured Gaza in 1187. In 1191 Saladin destroyed the fortifications in Gaza build by King Baldwin III for the Knights Templar. It is unclear exactly when, but during that same year, he attacked and captured the Crusader castle of Eilat, built on an island off the head of the Gulf of Aqaba. It did not pose a threat to the passage of the Muslim navy but could harass smaller parties of Muslim ships and Saladin decided to clear it from his path.

=== End of Fatimids and re-establishment of Abbasid authority in Egypt ===
According to Imad ad-Din, Nur ad-Din wrote to Saladin in June 1171, telling him to reestablish the Abbasid caliphate in Egypt, which Saladin coordinated two months later after additional encouragement by Najm ad-Din al-Khabushani, the Shafi'i faqih, who vehemently opposed Shia rule in the country. Several Egyptian emirs were thus killed, but al-Adid was told that they were killed for rebelling against him. He then fell ill or was poisoned according to one account. While ill, he asked Saladin to pay him a visit to request that he take care of his young children, but Saladin refused, fearing treachery against the Abbasids, and is said to have regretted his action after realizing what al-Adid had wanted.

Saladin's assault on the Fatimid regime culminated on 10 September 1171, when the Shafi'i jurist Najm al-Din al-Khabushani publicly proclaimed the name of the Sunni Abbasid caliph, al-Mustadi, instead of al-Adid's, and read out a list of the Fatimids' crimes. This symbolic act restored the country to Abbasid suzerainty after two centuries of Isma'ili Fatimid rule, but was met by general indifference among the Egyptian populace. The Fatimid regime was at an end, but al-Adid likely never learned of it, being already on his deathbed due to a severe illness. His death on 13 September 1171 at the age of twenty only sealed the demise of the Fatimid Caliphate. Some medieval sources claim that al-Adid either committed suicide, was poisoned, or was murdered by Turan-Shah when he refused to reveal where his treasures were hidden, but according to Halm, there is "no serious evidence for a violent elimination" of the caliph, and Saladin's own utterances suggest he thought that the caliph had died of natural causes.

Saladin's reaction to al-Adid's death was careful: he attended the funeral for al-Adid in person, but also organized a parade of his troops as a show of force against any lingering pro-Fatimid sentiment. Publicly, it was stated simply that al-Adid had failed to appoint his oldest son, Daoud, as heir, and thus the caliphal throne was vacant. While Saladin put on a public show of grief, the death of al-Adid and the end of the Fatimid Caliphate caused undisguised jubilation among the Sunni partisans of Saladin's own entourage: Saladin's secretary, al-Katib al-Isfahani, wrote a celebratory poem likening al-Adid to Pharaoh and Saladin to Joseph (Yusuf in Arabic, Saladin's birth name), and calling him a bastard and a heretic. When the news reached Baghdad, the city was festooned in Abbasid black, and Caliph al-Mustadi sent robes of honour to Saladin and Nur al-Din.

Al-Adil died on 13 September, and five days later, the Abbasid khutba was pronounced in Cairo and al-Fustat, proclaiming al-Mustadi as caliph.

== Religious policy ==
During the reign of the caliph, al-Mustadi, Ibn al-Jawzi began to be recognized "as one of the most influential persons in Baghdad." As al-Mustadi as a ruler was especially partial to Hanbalism, Ibn al-Jawzi was given free rein to promote Hanbalism by way of his preaching throughout Baghdad. The numerous sermons Ibn al-Jawzi delivered from 1172 to 1173 cemented his reputation as the premier scholar in Baghdad at the time; indeed, the scholar soon began to be so appreciated for his gifts as an orator that al-Mustadi even went so far as to have a special dais (Arabic dikka) constructed specially for Ibn al-Jawzi in the Palace mosque. Ibn al-Jawzi's stature as a scholar only continued to grow in the following years. By 1179, Ibn al-Jawzi had written over one hundred and fifty works and was directing five colleges in Baghdad simultaneously. It was at this time that he told al-Mustadi to engrave an inscription onto the widely venerated tomb of Ibn Hanbal (d. 855) – the revered founder of the Hanbali rite – which referred to the famed jurist as "Imām."

Al-Mustadi as a Caliph, sought to emulate the Rashidun caliphs widely considered a model Islamic rulers. He therefore lived an austere and pious life: Benjamin of Tudela, who traveled to this area between 1160 and 1173, noted: "Two days from Akbara stands Baghdad. The large metropolis of Calif Emir-al-Mumenin al Abassi Amir al-Mu'minin, of the family of their prophet, who is chief of the Mahometan religion. All Mahometan kings acknowledge him, and he holds the same dignity over them which the Pope enjoys over the Christians. The palace of the Caliph at Baghdad is three miles in extent. It contains a large park filled with all sorts of trees, both useful and ornamental, and all kinds of beasts, as well as a pond of water carried thither from the river Tigris; and whenever the Caliph desires to enjoy himself and to sport and carouse, birds, beasts and fishes are prepared for him and for his courtiers, whom he invites to his palace. This great Abassid is extremely friendly towards the Jews, many of his officers being of that nation; he understands all languages, is well versed in Mosaic law, and reads and writes the Hebrew tongue. He enjoys nothing but what he earns by the labor of his own hands, and therefore manufactures coverlets, which he stamps with his seal, and which his officers sell in the public market..."

== Family ==
One of Al-Mustadi's concubines was Zumurrud Khatun. She was a Turkish, and was the mother of the future Caliph Al-Nasir. She died in December 1202 – January 1203, or January–February 1203, and was buried in her own mausoleum in Sheikh Maarouf Cemetery. Another of his concubines was Al-Sayyida Banafsha. She was the daughter of Abdullah, a Greek, and was Al-Mustadi's favourite concubine. She died on 27 December 1201, and was buried in the mausoleum of Zumurrud Khatun in Sheikh Maarouf Cemetery. Another concubine was Sharaf Khatun. She was a Turkish, and was the mother of Prince Abu Mansur Hashim. She died on 27 December 1211, and was buried in the Rusafah Cemetery. Some other concubines were Khtalj Khatun and al-Abbasah. Both of them were Turkish.

== Death and succession ==
In 1180, Caliph Al-Mustadi died and was succeeded by his son Al-Nasir.

As a young prince al-Nasir received good education in Baghdad along with his siblings. He also fathered some children. Al-Nasir had a half-brother Abu Mansur Hashim ibn Hassan al-Mustadi. In 1180, Hashim tried to gather support for himself to become caliph, however he was unsuccessful and was easily overpowered by the new caliph.

His son and successor al-Nasir continued the efforts of his great-grandfather al-Muqtafi in restoring the caliphate to its ancient dominant role and achieved a surprising amount of success as his army even conquered parts of Iran. According to the historian, Angelika Hartmann, al-Nasir was the last effective Abbasid caliph. He was able to gain full control over Mesopotamia.

== See also ==
- Baghdad School also known as the Arab school was an influential school of Islamic art developed during the late 12th century in the Abbasid capital Baghdad.

== Bibliography ==
- El-Hibri, Tayeb (2021). The Abbasid Caliphate: A History. Cambridge and New York: Cambridge University Press. ISBN 978-1-107-18324-7.
- Lyons, Malcolm Cameron; Jackson, D. E. P. (1982). Saladin: The Politics of the Holy War. Cambridge: Cambridge University Press. ISBN 0-521-31739-8.
- Pringle, Denys (1993). The Churches of the Crusader Kingdom of Jerusalem: Volume 3, The City of Jerusalem: A Corpus. Cambridge University Press. ISBN 978-0-521-39038-5.
- This text is adapted from William Muir's public domain, The Caliphate: Its Rise, Decline, and Fall.
- Brett, Michael (2017). The Fatimid Empire. The Edinburgh History of the Islamic Empires. Edinburgh: Edinburgh University Press. ISBN 978-0-7486-4076-8.
- Daftary, Farhad (2007). The Ismāʿı̄lı̄s: Their History and Doctrines (Second ed.). Cambridge: Cambridge University Press. ISBN 978-0-521-61636-2.
- Halm, Heinz (2014). Kalifen und Assassinen: Ägypten und der vordere Orient zur Zeit der ersten Kreuzzüge, 1074–1171 [Caliphs and Assassins: Egypt and the Near East at the Time of the First Crusades, 1074–1171] (in German). Munich: C. H. Beck. doi:10.17104/9783406661648-1. ISBN 978-3-406-66163-1.
- Lev, Yaacov (1999). Saladin in Egypt. Leiden, Boston, Köln: Brill. ISBN 90-04-11221-9.
- Sajjadi, Sadeq; Daftary, Farhad; Umar, Suheyl (2008). "Al-ʿĀḍid". In Madelung, Wilferd; Daftary, Farhad (eds.). Encyclopaedia Islamica, Volume 3 (Adab – al-Bāb al-Ḥādī ͑ashar). Leiden & Boston: Brill. pp. 69–73. ISBN 978-90-04-16860-2.
- Saleh, Marlis J. (2009). "al-ʿĀḍid li-Dīn Allāh". In Fleet, Kate; Krämer, Gudrun; Matringe, Denis; Nawas, John; Rowson, Everett (eds.). Encyclopaedia of Islam (3rd ed.). Brill Online. doi:10.1163/1573-3912_ei3_COM_22734. ISSN 1873-9830.
- Şeşen, Ramazan (1988). "Âdıd-Lidînillâh". TDV Encyclopedia of Islam, Vol. 1 (Âb-ı Hayat – El-ahkâmü'ş-şer'i̇yye) (in Turkish). Istanbul: Presidency of Religious Affairs, Centre for Islamic Studies. pp. 374–375. ISBN 978-975-954-801-8.
- Wiet, G. (1960). "al-ʿĀḍid li-Dīn Allāh". In Gibb, H. A. R.; Kramers, J. H.; Lévi-Provençal, E.; Schacht, J.; Lewis, B. & Pellat, Ch. (eds.). The Encyclopaedia of Islam, Second Edition. Volume I: A–B. Leiden: E. J. Brill. pp. 196–197. doi:10.1163/1573-3912_islam_SIM_0311. OCLC 495469456.

Al-Mustadi Abbasid dynasty Born: 1142 Died: 30 March 1180
Sunni Islam titles
| Preceded by Al-Mustanjid | Caliph of Islam; Abbasid Caliph; 20 December 1170 – 30 March 1180 | Succeeded by An-Nasir |
