= Ibrahim al-Kurdi =

Kurdish ruler and general of the Ayyubid Sultanate

Ibrahim Al-Kurdi
- Emir

Emir of Nubia
- Reign: 1173-1175
- Died: 1175

Ibrahim Al-Kurdi (died 1175) was a Kurdish ruler and a military commander of the Ayyubid Sultanate. He was appointed by Turan-Shah in 1173 as the ruler of northern Nubia, centered in Qasir ibrim.

As the ruler of Ayyubid Nubia, he laid raids deep into Nubian lands, Archeological evidence suggests that al-Kurdī's army may have been responsible for an assault on the city of Faras in which they killed the bishop. The town had once been the capital of Marīs and it had retained its importance as an ecclesiastical center. In 1175 al-Kurdī and some of his men drowned while attempting to reach the island of Adindan in the Nile.

== Sources ==
- Plumley, J. Martin (1983). "Qasr Ibrim and Islam". Études et Travaux. XII: 157–170.
