= Hilal al-Sabi' =

Arab historian, bureaucrat and writer (c.969–1056)

- Born: Abūʾl-Ḥusayn Hilāl b. Muḥassin b. Ibrāhīm al-Ṣābīʾ; 969 CE; Baghdad, Abbasid Caliphate (modern-day Iraq)
- Died: 1056 CE; Baghdad, Abbasid Caliphate (modern-day Iraq)
- Occupations: Historian, Bureaucrat, Writer

Academic work
- Era: Buyid era
- Notable works: Rusum dar al-khilafa, Kitab al-wuzara, Tarikh Hilal al-Sabi

Abūʾl-Ḥusayn Hilāl b. Muḥassin b. Ibrāhīm al-Ṣābīʾ (Arabic: ابو الحسين هلال بن محسن بن ابراهيم الصابئ) (born: 358 A.H./c. 969 A.D., died: 447-448 A.H./1056 A.D.) (aged 90 lunar) was a historian, bureaucrat, and writer of Arabic. Born into a family of Sabian bureaucrats, al-Ṣābi converted to Islam in 402-403 A.H/1012 AD. First working under the Buyid amir Ṣamṣām al-Dawla, he later became the Director of the Chancery under Baha' al-Daula's vizier Fakhr al-Mulk.

== Works ==
Hilal al-Sabi' is the author of numerous books, not all of which have survived. Bureaucratic matters and matters of the court were his main themes, along with history.

- The Rules and Regulations of the Abbasid Court - (Arabic: رسوم دار الخلافة Rusum dar al-khilafa)

Perhaps his most famous book is the Rusum dar al-khilafa which is a manual for behavior and work in the Abbasid court of late Buyid Baghdad. Though it is designed as a set of instructions and advice, the book contains numerous statistics, anecdotes and historical asides.

- The Book of Viziers - (Arabic: كتاب الوزراء Kitab al-wuzara)

Only the beginning of this work has survived, which deals with the viziers of the caliphs Al-Mu'tadid and Al-Muqtadir, namely Ali ibn al-Furat, Muhammad al-Haqqani, and Ali ibn Isa. The work was composed sometime between 1031 and 1041 AD. It notably preserves a detailed budget of the Abbasid court, presented by Hilal al-Sabi as dating to al-Mu'tadid's reign but believed by some scholars to have actually been intended for al-Muqtadir, possibly as a memorandum during a period of financial difficulty. This budget has been used by modern historians as a rare source of information on state expenditures in a premodern Islamic polity.

- History of Hilal al-Sabi' - (Arabic: تاريخ ابي الحسين هلال بن المحسن بن ابراهيم الصابي Tarikh Hilal al-Sabi)

This too survives only in fragmentary form, but its fragments fill a gap in the chronicles of the late Buyid era, up to the year 393 hijri (1003 AD).

== See also ==
- Category:Sabian scholars from the Abbasid Caliphate
- Al-Battani
- Thābit ibn Qurra
- List of Muslim historians
- Islamic scholars
- Sabians

== Bibliography ==
- Sourdel, D. (1971). "Hilāl b. al-Muḥassin b. Ibrāhīm al-Ṣābiʾ". In Lewis, B.; Ménage, V. L.; Pellat, Ch. & Schacht, J. (eds.). The Encyclopaedia of Islam, Second Edition. Volume III: H–Iram. Leiden: E. J. Brill. OCLC 495469525.
- Hilāl al-Sābi’. Rusūm Dār al-Khilāfa: The Rules and Regulations of the Abbasid Court. Trans. Elie A. Salem. American University of Beirut, 1977.
