= Al-Zafir =

Fatimid Caliph from 1149 to 1154

al-Zafir bi-Amr Allah الظافر بأمر الله
- Caliph; Amir al-Mu'minīn
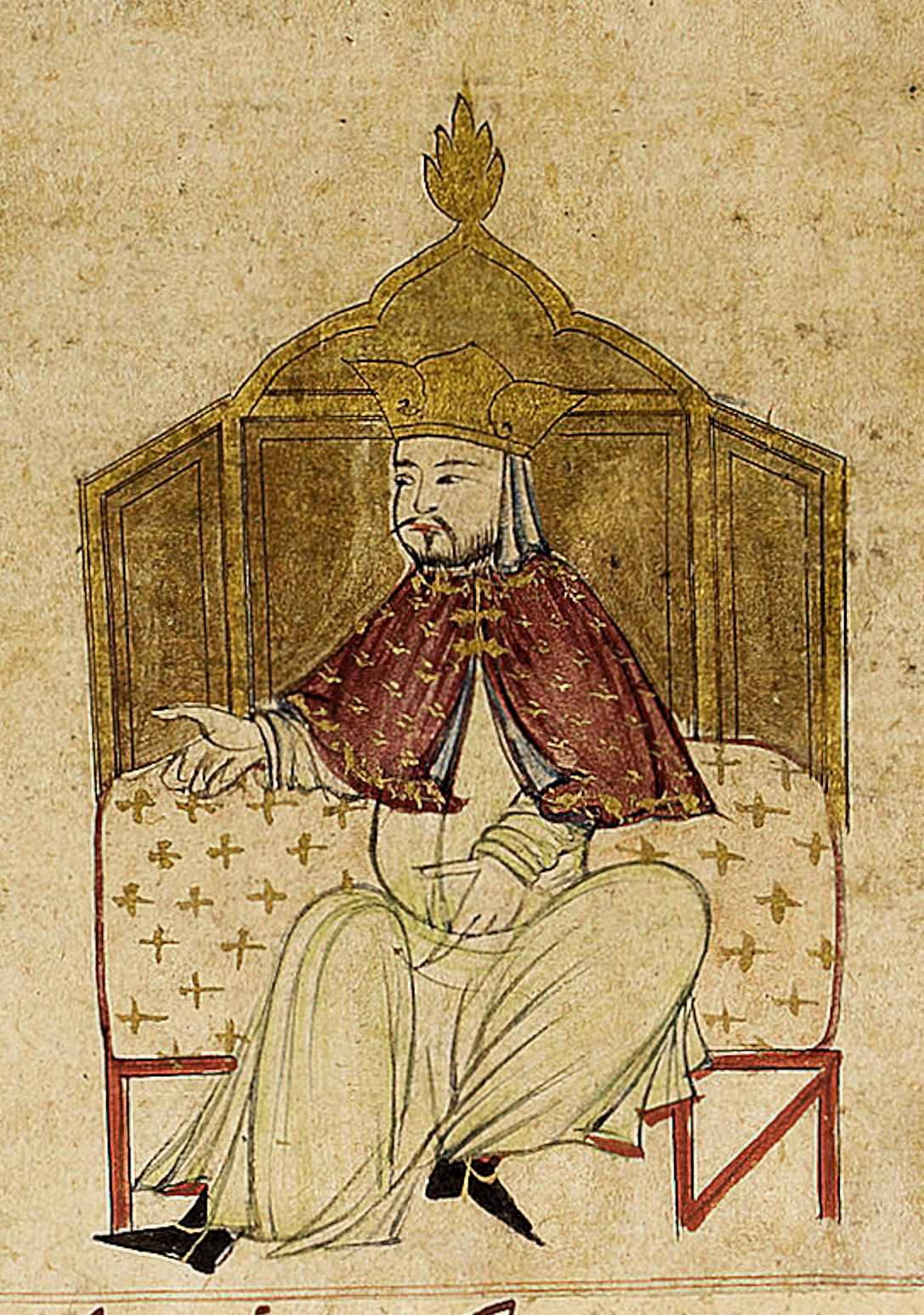
- Caliph al-Zafir in conversation with a nobleman (Caliph enthroned). Hafiz-i Abru's Majma al-Tawarikh (The Assembly of History). Timurid Persia, Herat, circa 1425

Imam–Caliph of the Fatimid Caliphate
- Reign: 1149 – 1154
- Predecessor: al-Hafiz li-Din Allah
- Successor: al-Fa'iz bi-Nasr Allah
- Born: 23 February 1133
- Died: 1 or 15 April 1154 (aged 21); Cairo
- Issue: al-Fa'iz bi-Nasr Allah
- Dynasty: Fatimid
- Father: al-Hafiz
- Religion: Hafizi Isma'ilism

Abū Manṣūr Ismāʿīl ibn al-Ḥāfiẓ (Arabic: أبو منصور إسماعيل بن الحافظ, February 1133 – April 1154), better known by his regnal name al-Ẓāfir bi-Amr Allāh (الظافر بأمر الله, lit. 'Victorious by the Command of God') or al-Ẓāfir bi-Aʿdāʾ Allāh (الظافر بأعداء الله, lit. 'Victor over God's Enemies'), was the twelfth Fatimid caliph, reigning in Egypt from 1149 to 1154, and the 22nd imam of the Hafizi Isma'ili branch of Shia Islam.

The vizer and military leader Al-Adil ibn al-Sallar effectively ruled Egypt during his time on the throne. Al-Adil ibn al-Sallar rise to power mark the beginning of the end for the Fatimid state: from al-Zafir on the caliphs were underage children, sidelined and mere puppets at the hands of the strongmen who vied for the vizierate. This power struggle between generals and viziers dominated the last decades of the Fatimid state, until its takeover by Saladin in 1171.

== Life ==
The future al-Zafir was born on 23 February 1133, as the fifth son of the eleventh Fatimid imam-caliph, al-Hafiz li-Din Allah (r. 1132–1149). As all his older brothers predeceased their father, al-Zafir was appointed heir-apparent.

=== Accession and the vizierate of Ibn Masal ===
Al-Zafir was proclaimed caliph immediately after his father's death, on 10 October 1149. By this time, the Fatimid dynasty was in decline. The official sect of Isma'ili Shi'ism had lost its appeal and was weakened by disputes and schisms, and the dynasty's legitimacy was increasingly challenged by a Sunni resurgence in Egypt. The Fatimid caliphs themselves had become virtual puppets in the hands of their viziers, whose power was such that chroniclers often attributed to them the royal title of sultan. Al-Zafir's father had tried to curtail the power of his viziers, and for the last decade of his reign, did not appoint anyone to that office, instead relying on high-ranking clerks as ad hoc directors of government affairs.

The accession of al-Zafir undid these efforts. Salim ibn Masal, who had served as al-Hafiz' leading minister since 1139/40, ensured al-Zafir's quick accession. In return, the underage caliph, more interested in the pleasures of the palace than governing, appointed Ibn Masal to the vacant vizierate, with full and plenipotentiary powers. To calm the rival military factions of the Turks and Black Africans, who were clashing in the streets of Cairo, a generous donative was distributed and promises were made to look after them. The situation was brought under control in November, when Ibn Masal executed the faction leaders.

Ibn Masal lasted between 40 and 50 days in office, being overthrown by the governor of Alexandria, Ibn al-Sallar, who had previously entertained hopes of becoming vizier himself. Following the appointment of Ibn Masal, together with his stepson Abbas ibn Abi al-Futuh, Ibn al-Sallar marched on Cairo to seize the vizierate. When al-Zafir learned of Ibn Sallar's intentions, he called upon assistance from the grandees of the realm in support of Ibn Masal, but they proved unwilling to. In the end, the Caliph provided Ibn Masal with funds to raise an army for action against Ibn al-Sallar. Ibn Masal assembled a force of Lawata Berbers, of Black Africans, of Bedouin Arabs and of native Egyptians, but despite a first success in the field, he was soon forced to leave Cairo in December 1149 for Lower Egypt, to recruit more men, while Ibn al-Sallar took over the city.

=== Vizierate of Ibn al-Sallar ===
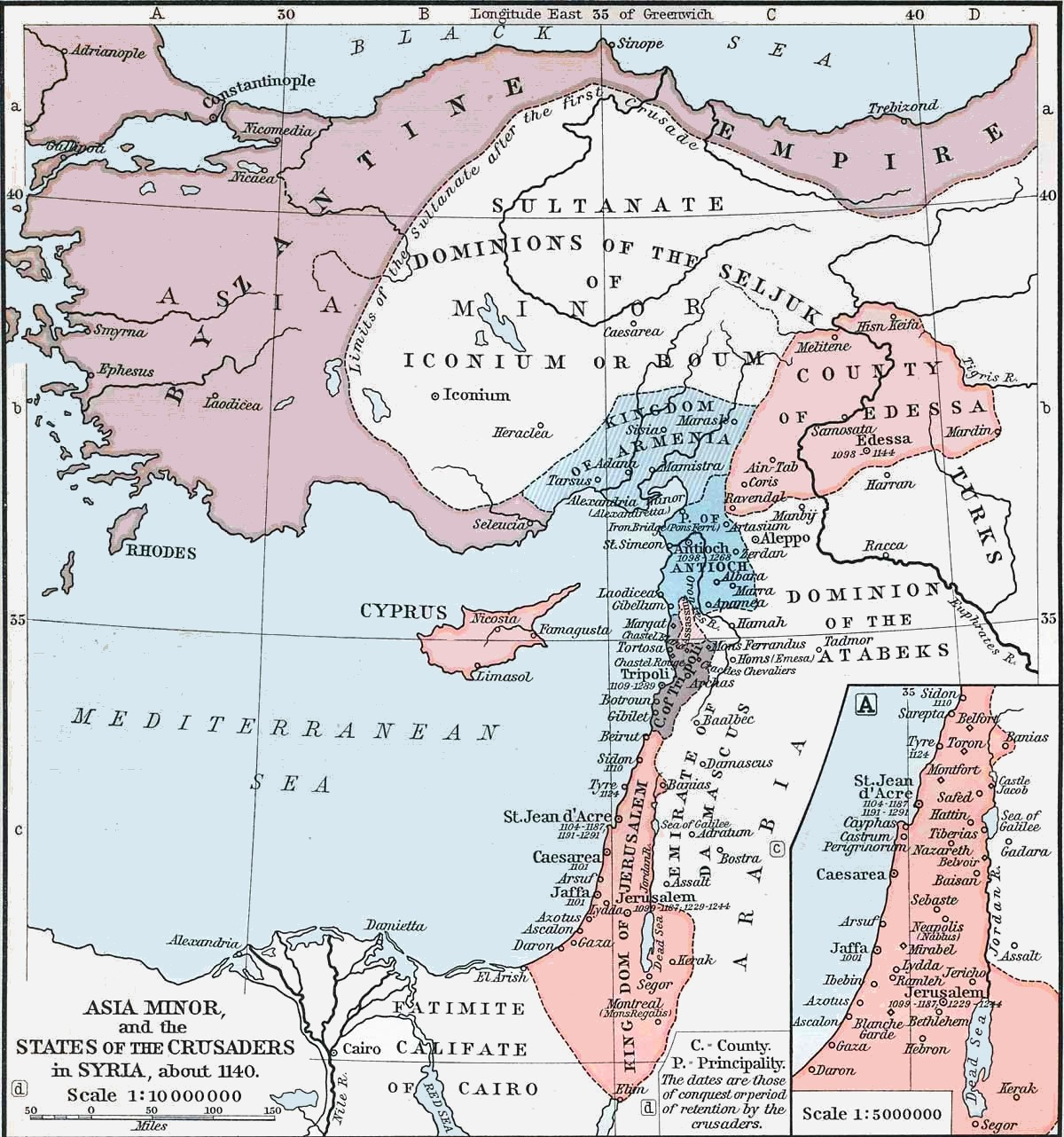
Political map of the Levant in c. 1140

Al-Zafir was unreconciled to the new situation, and conspired to have Ibn al-Sallar killed. In retaliation, in January 1150 Ibn al-Sallar gathered the caliphal guard (sibyan al-khass), an elite corps of cadets comprising the sons of high dignitaries and officials, and executed most of them, sending the rest to serve on the empire's frontiers. After that, he executed the chief supervisor of the government departments (nazir fi'l-dawawin), Abu'l-Karam Muhammad ibn Ma'sum al-Tinnisi. After securing Cairo, an army under his stepson Abbas, along with Tala'i ibn Ruzzik, was sent to confront Ibn Masal and his ally, Badr ibn Rafi. The two armies met in battle at Dalas in the province of Bahnasa on 19 February 1150, in which Ibn Masal was defeated and killed. Abbas brought his severed head back to Cairo as a token of victory.

Unsurprisingly, the relationship between caliph and vizier remained extremely hostile: according to Usama ibn Munqidh, the two despised each other, with the Caliph conspiring to kill Ibn al-Sallar, and the latter seeking to depose the Caliph. The mutual hatred of both men was only kept in check by the grave external threats faced by the empire from the Crusades of the Kingdom of Jerusalem. Ibn al-Sallar's vizierate was dominated by the war with the Crusader principalities of the Levant. After the Crusaders sacked the Mediterranean port town of al-Farama in October/November 1150, Ibn al-Sallar organized a large-scale naval expedition that raided the Levant coast, attacking the ports of Jaffa, Acre, Beirut, and Tripoli to devastating effect. The raid, though successful, was a hollow victory, as the Fatimids failed to follow it up; it also cost the enormous sum of 300,000 gold dinars, so that the treasury had to curtail expenses, such as the free distribution of clothing in Cairo. It also failed to elicit any response from the Muslim rulers of Syria, Nur al-Din Zengi of Aleppo and Mujir al-Din Abaq of Damascus, who were preoccupied with their own rivalries. In contrast, in early 1153 the Crusaders launched an attack on the Fatimid outpost of Ascalon.

In March 1153, Ibn al-Sallar sent reinforcements to the city under his stepson Abbas and Usama ibn Munqidh. According to the historian al-Maqrizi, this mission displeased Abbas, who would much rather have continued to spend his time savouring the pleasures of Cairo. His ambition inflamed by Usama, who suggested that he could become sultan of Egypt if only he so desired, Abbas decided to kill his stepfather. The plot was hatched with the agreement of the Caliph. Abbas sent his son Nasr, a favourite of the Caliph, back to in Cairo to stay with his grandmother in the palace of Ibn al-Sallar, ostensibly to spare him from the dangers of war. During the night Nasr entered the chamber of Ibn al-Sallar and murdered him in his sleep. He then sent a message by carrier pigeon to his father, who quickly returned to Cairo to claim the vizierate for himself (9 April), showing Ibn al-Sallar's severed head to the populace assembled before the Bab al-Dhahab gate. Abandoned to its fate, Ascalon, the last Fatimid outpost in the Levant, fell to the Crusaders in August 1153.

=== Murder and aftermath ===
Ibn al-Sallar had been generally resented due to his greed and cruelty, but had apparently favoured the Sunni cause in Egypt, and was likely behind the appointment of a Sunni chief qāḍī. As a result, his Sunni supporters appealed the al-Zafir for the punishment of Ibn Mandiqh, whom they held responsible for the murder. Ibn Mandiqh, afraid for his life, turned to Abbas, inciting him against al-Zafir with the rumour of a sexual relationship between al-Zafir and Nasr; Ibn Munqidh in his own memoirs claims that the Caliph wanted to use Nasr to eliminate Abbas, but was informed of the plot by Nasr. Abbas became enraged, and persuaded his son to assassinate the caliph. Nasr invited al-Zafir to spend the night together at the vizieral palace of Dar al-Ma'mun. On arrival, the Caliph and his small escort were killed, with their bodies thrown into a pit close by. This was on 1 or 15 April 1154.

On the next day, Abbas rode to the palace gates, ostensibly looking for al-Zafir. A search ensued, but eventually the truth became known when a servant of the caliph's escort, who had managed to hide and escape the massacre of the previous night, informed the palace. While the palace women began mourning, Abbas and his own escort forced their way into the palace and installed himself in the grand audience chamber. When al-Zafir's two younger brothers, Jibril and Yusuf, demanded that Nasr be questioned on the whereabouts of the Caliph, Abbas ordered them executed, and announced to the public that they had confessed to being responsible for the Caliph's murder. In his stead, al-Zafir's five-year-old son, Isa, was proclaimed caliph as al-Fa'iz bi-Nasr Allah. The young caliph was so shocked by the sight of the bloody corpses of his uncles and the loud acclamations of the court officials, that he became insane.

=== Legacy ===
Al-Zafir's rule marks the beginning of the end for the Fatimid state: from then on the caliphs were underage youths, sidelined from government affairs and mere puppets at the hands of the strongmen who vied for the vizierate. The power struggle between generals and viziers dominated the last decades of the Fatimid state, until its takeover by Saladin in 1171.

In 1148/49, al-Zafir built a mosque in Cairo, near the Bab Zuwayla gate, and attached several properties as an endowment towards its upkeep. The Zafiri Mosque also served for teaching Islamic law, and a group of jurists (faqihs) were attached to it for that purpose.

== See also ==
- List of rulers of Egypt

== Sources ==
- Al-Imad, Leila S. (2015). "al-ʿĀdil b. al-Sallār". In Fleet, Kate; Krämer, Gudrun; Matringe, Denis; Nawas, John; Rowson, Everett (eds.). Encyclopaedia of Islam (3rd ed.). Brill Online. ISSN 1873-9830.
- Bianquis, Thierry (2002). "al-Ẓāfir bi-Aʿdāʾ Allāh". In Bearman, P. J.; Bianquis, Th.; Bosworth, C. E.; van Donzel, E. & Heinrichs, W. P. (eds.). The Encyclopaedia of Islam, Second Edition. Volume XI: W–Z. Leiden: E. J. Brill. pp. 382–383. ISBN 978-90-04-12756-2.
- Brett, Michael (2017). The Fatimid Empire. The Edinburgh History of the Islamic Empires. Edinburgh: Edinburgh University Press. ISBN 978-0-7486-4076-8.
- Canard, Marius (1971). "Ibn Maṣāl". In Lewis, B.; Ménage, V. L.; Pellat, Ch. & Schacht, J. (eds.). The Encyclopaedia of Islam, Second Edition. Volume III: H–Iram. Leiden: E. J. Brill. p. 868. doi:10.1163/1573-3912_islam_SIM_3288. OCLC 495469525.
- Daftary, Farhad (2007). The Ismāʿı̄lı̄s: Their History and Doctrines (Second ed.). Cambridge: Cambridge University Press. ISBN 978-0-521-61636-2.
- Halm, Heinz (2014). Kalifen und Assassinen: Ägypten und der vordere Orient zur Zeit der ersten Kreuzzüge, 1074–1171 [Caliphs and Assassins: Egypt and the Near East at the Time of the First Crusades, 1074–1171] (in German). Munich: C. H. Beck. doi:10.17104/9783406661648-1. ISBN 978-3-406-66163-1.
- Lev, Yaacov (1999). Saladin in Egypt. Leiden: Brill. ISBN 90-04-11221-9.
- Öztürk, Murat (2013). "Zâfir-Biemrillâh". TDV Encyclopedia of Islam, Vol. 44 (Yusuf – Zwemer) (in Turkish). Istanbul: Presidency of Religious Affairs, Centre for Islamic Studies. pp. 69–70. ISBN 978-975-389-785-3.
- Sanders, Paula A. (1998). "The Fatimid State, 969–1171". In Petry, Carl F. (ed.). The Cambridge History of Egypt: Islamic Egypt, 640–1517. Vol. 1. Cambridge: Cambridge University Press. pp. 151–174. ISBN 0-521-47137-0.
- Walker, Paul E. (2017). "al-Ḥāfiẓ li-Dīn Allāh". In Fleet, Kate; Krämer, Gudrun; Matringe, Denis; Nawas, John; Rowson, Everett (eds.). Encyclopaedia of Islam (3rd ed.). Brill Online. ISSN 1873-9830.
- Daftary, Farhad (1990). The Ismāʿı̄lı̄s: Their History and Doctrines (First ed.). Cambridge: Cambridge University Press. ISBN 978-0-521-37019-6.

al-Zafir Fatimid dynasty Born: late February 1133 Died: March 1154
Preceded by al-Hafiz li-Din Allah	Fatimid Caliph; 10 October 1149 – 1 or 15 April 1154	Succeeded by al-Fa'iz bi-Nasr Allah
Preceded by al-Hafiz li-Din Allah	Imam of Hafizi Isma'ilism; 10 October 1149 – 1 or 15 April 1154	Succeeded by al-Fa'iz bi-Nasr Allah
