= Abu Shuja Muhammad al-Ashraf =

Abu Shuja Muhammad al-Ashraf ibn Muhammad ibn Ali ibn Khalaf was a vizier of the Fatimid caliph al-Mustansir Billah on two brief occasions in 1064–65.

Abu Shuja's date of birth is unknown. He was the son of the Buyid vizier Fakhr al-Mulk, who had been executed by the Buyid emir Sultan al-Dawla in 1016. Historians stress his family's enormous wealth, but also his integrity. He served as vizier to al-Mustansir during the chaos of the Mustansirite Hardship, for only two days in December 1064 and again from January to February 1065. He held the titles of al-ajall (lit. 'the illustrious one') and al-muʿaẓẓam (lit. 'the exalted one'), as well as his father's title of fakhr al-mulk (lit. 'glory of the realm').

When Badr al-Jamali was called to take over the vizierate by al-Mustansir in 1073, Abu Shuja left for Syria, but was intercepted and executed by Badr al-Jamali.

== Sources ==
- al-Imad, Leila S. (1990). The Fatimid Vizierate (979-1172). Berlin: Klaus Schwarz Verlag. ISBN 3-922968-82-1.
- Saleh, Abdel Hamid (2002). "Ibn Ḵh̲alaf". In Bearman, P. J.; Bianquis, Th.; Bosworth, C. E.; van Donzel, E. & Heinrichs, W. P. (eds.). The Encyclopaedia of Islam, Second Edition. Volume XI: W–Z. Leiden: E. J. Brill. p. 390. doi:10.1163/1573-3912_islam_SIM_8656. ISBN 978-90-04-12756-2.
