= Ibn Masal =

Military commander of Fatimid Caliphate

De facto vizier (Nāẓir fi’l-Umūr / Nāẓir fi’l-Maṣāliḥ)
- In office October 1149 – February 1150
- Preceded by: Vacant (since 1139)
- Succeeded by: Al-Adil ibn al-Sallar

Personal details
- Born: Najm al-Dīn Abu’l-Fath Salim/Sulaymān ibn Muḥammad al-Lukkī al-Maghrībī; Lukk, Cyrenaica (Libya)
- Died: 19 February 1150; Dalāṣ (al-Bahnasa), Egypt
- Occupation: Military commander; state official
- Known for: Brief tenure as de facto vizier; managing factional military tensions; defeated and killed in battle by Ibn al-Sallar’s forces

Najm al-Din Abu'l-Fath Salim/Sulayman ibn Muhammad al-Lukki al-Maghribi (Arabic: ﻧﺠﻢ ﺍﻟﺪﻳﻦ ﺍﺑﻮ ﺍﻟﻔﺘﺢ ﺳﻠﻴﻢ/ﺴﻠﻴﻤﺎﻥ ﺑﻦ ﻣﺤﻤﺪ ﺍﻟﻠﻜﻲ, romanized: Najm al-Dīn Abu’l-Fatḥ Salīm/Sulaymān ibn Muḥammad al-Lukkī al-Maghribī), better known as Ibn Masal (Arabic: ﺍﺑﻦ ﻣﺼﺎﻝ, romanized: Ibn Maṣāl), was a military commander and official of the Fatimid Caliphate, who served briefly as the de facto vizier of the Caliphate from 1144/45 until he was overthrown and killed by al-Adil ibn al-Sallar and his supporters in the winter of 1149/50.

== Life ==
His nisbah (al-Maghribī) and the name Maṣāl suggest a Berber origin. He was born in the town of Lukk in the Cyrenaica. From his father, he learned falconry and veterinary science, which enabled him to assume a military post in the Fatimid capital Cairo. Details of his military career are not known, but by 1144/45 he had risen to the point where he was entrusted with the leadership of the government by Caliph al-Hafiz. He was not given the title of vizier, however, which had been vacant since the ouster of Ridwan ibn Walakhshi in 1139, but instead was titled "supervisor of affairs" (nāẓir fi'l-umūr) and "supervisor of the public interests" (nāẓir fi'l-maṣāliḥ).

When al-Hafiz died in October 1149, his 16-year-old son al-Zafir succeeded him. Al-Zafir, who was more interested in the pleasures of the court than exercising governance, appointed Ibn Masal, despite the latter's advanced age, as his vizier. Ibn Masal received the customary titles of the Fatimid viziers, al-Sayyid al-ʿAjal ("most noble master"), Amīr al-Juyūsh ("commander of the armies"), and al-Mufaḍḍal ("the preferred one") or al-Afḍal ("most superior one"). He was quickly successful in calming the quarrels between the Turkish cavalry (Rayḥānī) and the black military slaves by distributing money and promising to take care of their future welfare.

He was soon after confronted with the rebellion of the governor of Alexandria, Ibn al-Sallar, who had entertained hopes of becoming vizier himself. Following the appointment of Ibn Masal, together with his stepson Abbas, Ibn al-Sallar marched on Cairo to seize the vizierate. When al-Zafir learned of Ibn Sallar's intentions, he called upon assistance from the grandees of the realm in support of Ibn Masal, but they proved unwilling to. In the end, the Caliph provided Ibn Masal with funds to raise an army for action against Ibn al-Sallar. Ibn Masal assembled a force of Lawata Berbers, of blacks, of Bedouin Arabs and of native Egyptians, but despite a first success in the field, he was soon forced to leave Cairo in December 1149 for Upper Egypt, to recruit more men, while Ibn al-Sallar took over the city. Ibn al-Sallar sent his stepson Abbas with an army against Ibn Masal and his ally, Badr ibn Rafi, who had tried unsuccessfully to rally resistance among the Arab tribes of the Nile Delta. The two armies met in battle at Dalas in the province of al-Bahnasa on 19 February 1150, in which Ibn Masal was defeated and killed. Abbas brought his severed head back to Cairo as a token of victory.

His vizierate had lasted only about 50 days. This was the last time a Fatimid caliph would exercise that right, as with Ibn al-Sallar's coup the vizierate became the object of fierce contest between rival strongmen, and the last Fatimid caliphs were reduced to mere figureheads.

A son of Ibn Masal is reported to have supported Shirkuh from Alexandria in 1166/67, before fleeing to Syria. He was later involved in, and is said to have betrayed a Pro-Fatimid conspiracy against Saladin in 1174.

== Sources ==
- al-Imad, Leila S. (1990). The Fatimid Vizierate (979-1172). Berlin: Klaus Schwarz Verlag. ISBN 3-922968-82-1.
- Al-Imad, Leila S. (2015). "al-ʿĀdil b. al-Sallār". In Fleet, Kate; Krämer, Gudrun; Matringe, Denis; Nawas, John; Rowson, Everett (eds.). Encyclopaedia of Islam (3rd ed.). Brill Online. ISSN 1873-9830.
- Bianquis, Thierry (2002). "al-Ẓāfir bi-Aʿdāʾ Allāh". In Bearman, P. J.; Bianquis, Th.; Bosworth, C. E.; van Donzel, E. & Heinrichs, W. P. (eds.). The Encyclopaedia of Islam, Second Edition. Volume XI: W–Z. Leiden: E. J. Brill. pp. 382–383. ISBN 978-90-04-12756-2.
- Canard, Marius (1971). "Ibn Maṣāl". In Lewis, B.; Ménage, V. L.; Pellat, Ch. & Schacht, J. (eds.). The Encyclopaedia of Islam, Second Edition. Volume III: H–Iram. Leiden: E. J. Brill. p. 868. doi:10.1163/1573-3912_islam_SIM_3288. OCLC 495469525.
- Daftary, Farhad (2007). The Ismāʿı̄lı̄s: Their History and Doctrines (Second ed.). Cambridge: Cambridge University Press. ISBN 978-0-521-61636-2.
- Halm, Heinz (2014). Kalifen und Assassinen: Ägypten und der vordere Orient zur Zeit der ersten Kreuzzüge, 1074–1171 [Caliphs and Assassins: Egypt and the Near East at the Time of the First Crusades, 1074–1171] (in German). Munich: C.H. Beck. ISBN 978-3-406-66163-1.

Vacant Title last held by Ridwan ibn Walakhshi	Vizier of the Fatimid Caliphate; 1149	Succeeded by al-Adil ibn al-Sallar
