= Siege of Ascalon =

1153 battle of the Crusades

Coordinates: 31°40′1.68″N 34°32′53.3″E

- Part of the Crusader–Fatimid wars
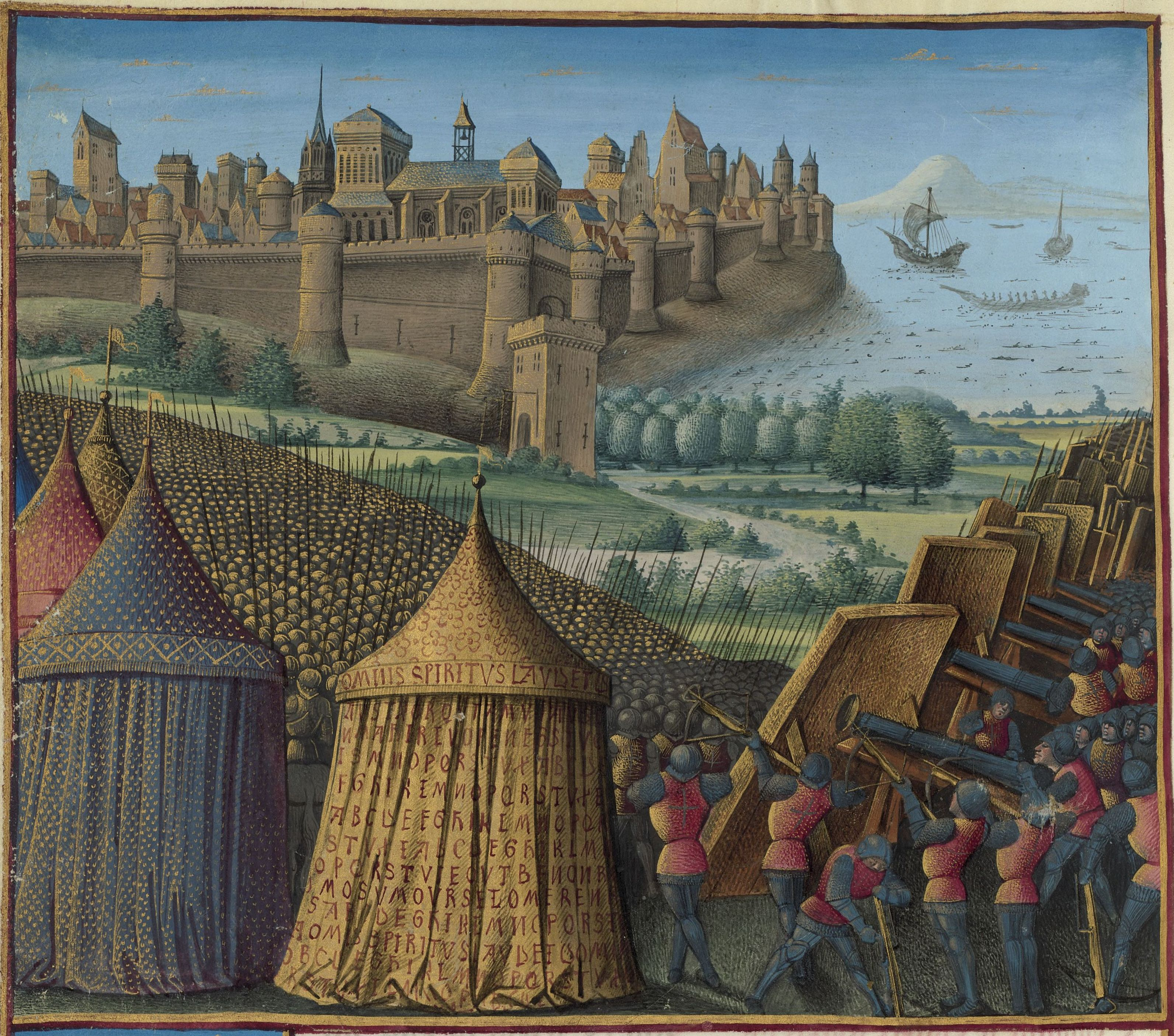
- The siege of Ascalon, miniature from Sébastien Mamerot's book "Passages d'outremer" (1474)
Date	25 January – 22 August 1153
Location	Ascalon
Result	Crusader victory

Belligerents
Kingdom of Jerusalem; Knights Templar; Knights Hospitaller	Fatimid Caliphate

Commanders and leaders
Baldwin III of Jerusalem; Gerard of Sidon; Bernard de Tremelay †; Hugues Salomon du Quiliou †; Raymond du Puy	Ibn al-Sallar

Strength
Unknown number of men 15 ships	Unknown number of men 70 ships

Casualties and losses
Total unknown 40 Templars killed	Unknown

The siege of Ascalon took place from 25 January to 22 August 1153, in the time period between the Second and Third Crusades, and resulted in the capture of the Fatimid Egyptian fortress by the Kingdom of Jerusalem. Ascalon was an important castle that was used by the Fatimids to launch raids into the Crusader kingdom's territory, and by 1153 it was the last coastal city in Palestine that was not controlled by the Crusaders.

The siege lasted for several months without much progress, despite the usage of siege engines and catapults by the Crusader army. On 16 August, the Fatimids set fire to the siege tower, but the wind blew the flames back at the castle wall and caused part of it to collapse. A group of Knights Templar entered the breach, led by their grand master, Bernard de Tremelay. The other Crusaders did not follow them into the city and all forty Templars were killed. Three days later, a larger attack was launched by the Crusaders and the city surrendered after more fighting. Its inhabitants were given three days to leave Ascalon before the Crusaders formally took it over on 22 August 1153.

Its capture was a major success for King Baldwin III of Jerusalem and put the Crusaders into a position to invade Egypt. The victory was also the first significant territorial gain for the Kingdom of Jerusalem since the acquisition of Banias in 1140.

== Background ==
=== Crusader–Fatimid wars ===
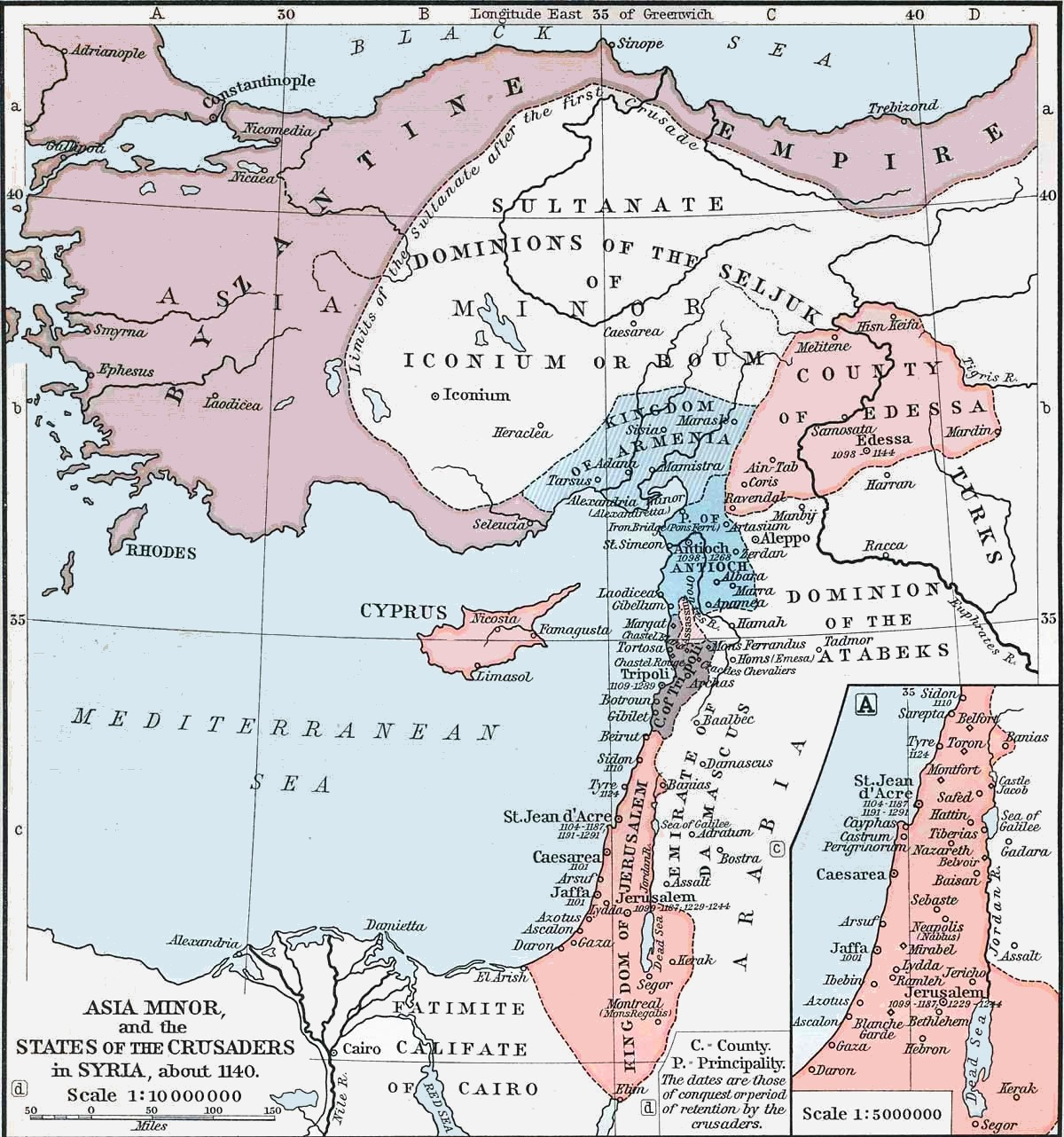
The crusader states c. 1140

Ascalon was an important fortress of the Egyptian Fatimid Caliphate in Palestine. The Battle of Ascalon was fought outside the city in 1099 in the aftermath of the First Crusade and the capture of Jerusalem by the Crusaders from the Fatimids. Although the Crusaders defeated the Fatimid army, internal disputes in their camp allowed Ascalon to remain in Egyptian hands. Thereafter, the Fatimids were able to launch frequent raids into the kingdom from this fortress, and it also served as staging ground for larger Egyptian invasions of Jerusalem (such as in 1101, 1102, and 1105). No invasions occurred after 1123, but there were continued raids from Ascalon against Jerusalem and by the Fatimid navy against coastal cities. The southern border of the kingdom and the roads taken by Christian pilgrims to the Holy Land remained unstable because of this. The Fatimid garrison in Ascalon received regular supplies from Egypt and was considered too strong for King Baldwin I of Jerusalem to attack it during the 1110s. The Fatimids considered the fortress to be a bulwark against a Crusader invasion of Egypt.

During the 1130s and 1140s a series of fortresses were built to watch Ascalon and defend the kingdom's southern border. These were Ibelin (Yibneh) about 20 miles (32 km) northeast of Ascalon near the coast, Blanchegarde (Tell es-Safi) about 15 miles (24 km) to the northeast, Beth Gibelin (Bayt Jibrin) about 20 miles (32 km) to the east and Montgisard near Ramla, nearly 30 miles (48 km) to the northeast. Around 1149–1150, Baldwin III of Jerusalem rebuilt part of the fortifications of Gaza City, which at that point lay in ruins, 10 miles (16 km) south of Ascalon. This ring of forts cut off Ascalon from overland supply routes, forcing the Fatimids to keep the city supplied by sea. The Christian military orders were also becoming more prominent in the defense of Jerusalem. Gaza was given to the Knights Templar and Beth Gibelin had already been entrusted to the Knights Hospitaller in 1136. These were the first major castles that each order received.

=== Second Crusade ===
The Second Crusade occurred after the Crusader city of Edessa fell to the Seljuk Turkic forces of Imad al-Din Zengi in 1144. Zengi's expansionism out of northern Syria around that time also led the emir of Damascus, Mujir ad-Din, to conclude an alliance with the Kingdom of Jerusalem in 1140 to protect his independence. But after Zengi died, his successor Nur ad-Din of Aleppo was initially seen as less of a threat to Damascus than the Latin Christians. Mujir concluded an alliance with Nur in 1147, which contributed to the decision of the Crusaders to besiege Damascus in 1148, as the Kingdom of Jerusalem could be threatened by a unified Muslim force to its north and east. But the Syrian campaign of the Second Crusade failed, and over the next several years Damascus was gradually brought under the influence of Nur ad-Din. Mujir continued to keep Damascus independent, and still cooperated with the Kingdom of Jerusalem on some occasions, though he and the city's population became more closely aligned with Nur.

The Crusaders' decision to attack Damascus strengthened the position of Nur ad-Din in Syria. In 1149 Nur defeated another Crusader state to the north of Jerusalem, the Principality of Antioch, and killed its ruler Prince Raymond at the Battle of Inab. The arrival of reinforcements in the form of King Baldwin III of Jerusalem and a company of Knights Templar led to a truce between Nur and the Principality of Antioch, which was left with Antioch itself and the coastal plain between Alexandretta and Latakia. With Nur ad-Din becoming more powerful to the north and east of Jerusalem, the Crusader kingdom looked south toward the Fatimid Caliphate in Egypt, which was divided by internal power struggles at the time. King Baldwin wanted to offset his defeats in the north by winning victories over the Muslims to the south. The Fatimid fortress at Ascalon was the last coastal city in Palestine still holding out against the Crusaders after the capture of Tyre in 1124.

=== Prelude ===
The Fatimid Caliphate had been unstable since the assassination of Al-Afdal Shahanshah, the powerful vizier of Egypt, and several of his successors, both caliphs and viziers, were also murdered over the next several decades. In 1150 King Baldwin rebuilt the defenses of Gaza, in preparation for an attack against Ascalon. In response to this the Egyptian vizier Ibn al-Sallar sent Usama ibn Munqidh to make an alliance with Nur ad-Din and organize an attack against the Crusaders, but Nur ad-Din refused, because he was focused on Damascus. Usama then stayed at Ascalon for two years and took part in fighting the Crusaders in the area. The Crusader army was also able to bypass the city to carry out limited raids into Egyptian territory. Muslim sources noted a Crusader attack against the town of al-Farama in 1150, located on the edge of the Nile Delta, and in the following year the Fatimids launched naval raids against port cities in Palestine.

However, Jerusalem itself was soon divided by civil war. Baldwin III was the legal heir to the kingdom, but his mother Queen Melisende had been ruling as regent. In April 1152 Baldwin wanted to be crowned as king, but his mother insisted on being crowned again with him, so that her continued authority was recognized. Instead of allowing this, Baldwin went to the Church of the Holy Sepulchre and forced the Patriarch of Jerusalem to only given the crown to him. The majority of the kingdom's nobility supported the Queen, and a royal council divided the kingdom, with Galilee being controlled by King Baldwin and the south, including Nablus and Jerusalem, by Queen Melisende. Their quarrel was eventually resolved and the kingdom reunited, though not before a Seljuk Turkish prince, Timurtash of Mardin, tried to take advantage of the civil war by attacking towards Jerusalem from Mujir ad-Din's territory. But the Crusader garrison of Jerusalem ventured out and defeated the Seljuk army when it was encamped at the Mount of Olives.

== The siege begins ==
After securing his rule over the kingdom and defeating the Seljuk attack on Jerusalem, King Baldwin III decided to attack Ascalon. According to William of Tyre, he gathered the entire army of the kingdom for the assault and began by destroying orchards outside of the city in January 1153. The residents of the area fled for shelter inside the fortress, and King Baldwin's army arrived outside the walls of Ascalon on 25 January 1153. He was accompanied by many important nobles and clergy of the kingdom: Patriarch Fulcher, along with Raymond du Puy and Bernard de Tremelay, the Grand Masters of the Knights of the Hospital and of the Temple, respectively, and the secular leaders, including Hugh of Ibelin, Philip of Milly, Humphrey II of Toron, Maurice of Montreal, Walter of Saint-Omer, and Raynald of Châtillon. The latter two were serving the king for pay. The knights and foot soldiers that came from different parts of the Kingdom of Jerusalem set up their own separate camps. To the south of Ascalon in Gaza, scouts were posted throughout the area to warn in case reinforcements for the besieged fortress were sent from Egypt by land. The siege was undertaken both by land and by sea, with the fleet commanded by Gerard of Sidon. The Crusader fleet was not a permanent naval force but was put together from ships that were present in the ports of the kingdom.

On the Fatimid side, the city was garrisoned by members of the local Kananiyya tribe, as well as a cavalry contingent from Cairo, some 400 to 600 strong, that was rotated into the city every six months. William of Tyre wrote that the townspeople became involved with the response to the siege and that the number of defenders in Ascalon was twice the size of the attacking army. The city was built as a semicircle along the coast, and its fortifications were considered very strong, consisting of massive walls and towers built on artificial mounds.

In response to the Crusader attack, the vizier Ibn al-Sallar began preparing reinforcements for the city in March, as well as a naval expedition. The Fatimid army set off and got as far as Bilbays, while Ibn al-Sallar supervised the final preparations of the fleet, including a naval review and the payment of the crews. The army commanders at Bilbays, led by Ibn al-Sallar's stepson Abbas ibn Abi al-Futuh, hatched a plot to kill the vizier, which was carried out on 3 April. The army returned to Cairo, where Abbas became vizier, leaving Ascalon largely to its fate. Around this time, Nur ad-Din sent his army to southern Syria and intended to assist the defenders at Ascalon by attacking the Crusader city of Banias, together with the army of Mujir ad-Din, the emir of Damascus. But the plan was cancelled and the attack was not carried out. According to Ibn al-Athir, this was because Mujir wanted to uphold his alliance with Jerusalem.

== Battles and surrender ==
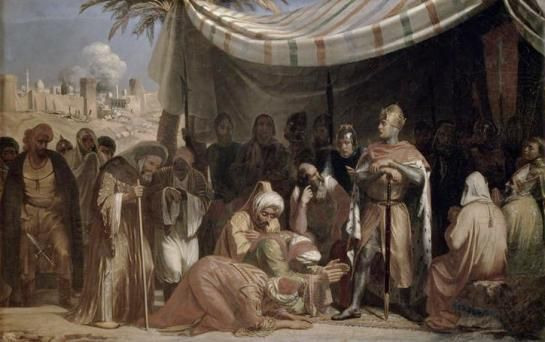
Baldwin III of Jerusalem receiving capitulation of Ascalon, by Sébastien-Melchior Cornu

The siege lasted for five months without much progress, and there were many skirmishes along the fortress walls with victories and defeats on both sides. The Crusader land army was later reinforced by knights and soldiers from among the Christian pilgrims who arrived in the Holy Land for Easter 1153. A siege tower, catapults, and battering rams were built using wood from the ships that brought the pilgrims. The battle continued into the summer of 1153. Catapults provided support for the siege tower, and their artillery attack was focused on the Jerusalem Gate, the front gate of Ascalon on the opposite side from the coast. It received its name from the fact that it was facing east, in the direction of Jerusalem, and the other gates of the city included the Jaffa (north) and Gaza (south) gates. There was also another gate near the coastline. The city's garrison suffered more from the artillery than the walls did, which remained intact.

In June, a Fatimid fleet of seventy galleys sailed to Ascalon and easily dispersed the weak Crusader squadron of fifteen ships, but as the city did not have a port or a harbor and was unsuitable for sustaining a fleet for long periods of time, it had to return to Egypt. The Fatimid Caliphate, unlike the Kingdom of Jerusalem, maintained a professional navy, one of the few Mediterranean powers to do so during this time period. The arrival of the Egyptian fleet helped the fortress hold out for another two months.

However, a setback for Ascalon occurred on the night of 15-16 August when the besieged tried to burn down one the Crusader siege tower; the wind pushed the fire back against their own walls, causing a large section to collapse. William of Tyre claimed that the knights of the Order rushed through the breach and kept the rest of the Christian army out, so that they could loot the city. Grand Master Bernard de Tremelay and about forty of his Templars were killed by the larger Egyptian garrison. Their bodies were hung from the castle walls. Muslim accounts of the siege do not mention the incident with the Templars, and the breach of the wall is simply mentioned as a precursor to the fall of the city. William of Tyre was known to have a bias against the Templars, and other accounts of the event indicate that the rest of the Crusader army hesitated to follow the Templars into the breach, and without any support, they were killed by the much larger Muslim force inside of Ascalon. Regardless of which account is believed, Bernard was killed during the fighting. Among the dead was also the Templar marshal, Hugues Salomon du Quiliou.

By now the crusaders were becoming fatigued and it was suggested that they abandon the siege, with the secular nobles all supporting this course of action. Raymond du Puy, the Grand Master of the Hospitallers, along with the Patriarch and the rest of the clergy, however, convinced the king that they were on the verge of victory. Three days later another assault was made, and another entrance was forced. After bitter fighting the city fell to the crusaders on 19 August, and the fortress was formally surrendered to them three days later on the 22nd, after the population was given time to leave. The citizens were allowed to leave in peace; most decided to leave for Egypt.

== Aftermath ==
The battle was an important victory for the Crusaders and increased the prestige of King Baldwin III. The Arab chronicler Ibn al-Qalanisi wrote that the fall of Ascalon had an effect on Muslim morale. It was also the first significant expansion of the Kingdom of Jerusalem since the acquisition of Banias in 1140. The increasing power of Jerusalem over the emirate of Damascus led Mujir ad-Din to start paying an annual tribute to the Crusader kingdom, though this was unpopular with his people. Nur ad-Din marched into Damascus and took it over on 25 April 1154, with support from its population, which began to see him as a defender of Islam. His capture of Damascus undermined the strategic significance of the fall of Ascalon, because it meant the Crusader kingdom had a new threat to its east, a united Muslim power from Aleppo to Damascus. But the successful siege also opened the way for the Crusader invasions of Egypt.

Historian Steven Runciman wrote that Egypt did not pose a threat to the Kingdom of Jerusalem, but the capture of Ascalon encouraged them to undertake a risky campaign against Egypt, which diverted their attention from Nur ad-Din. Amalric succeeded his brother as king of Jerusalem in 1163, and throughout the 1160s led several unsuccessful expeditions from Ascalon into Egypt. His defeat in the "Battle of Egypt" contributed to the weakening of the Crusaders' strategic position in the Levant, being forced to face Muslim powers to both their west and east, which led ultimately led to the Battle of Hattin and the loss of Jerusalem. According to historian Malcolm Barber, had Amalric succeeded, a conquest of Egypt could have prevented the possibility of the Muslim encirclement of the Crusader kingdom that Saladin achieved in 1187.

Ascalon was turned into a diocese directly under the Patriarch of Jerusalem, though eventually a decision from Rome subordinated it to the Bishop of Bethlehem. The city's mosque was reconsecrated as a church, the Cathedral of Saint Paul. The city was also added to the County of Jaffa, which was already held by Baldwin III's brother Amalric.

== Sources ==
- Baldwin, Marshal W.; Setton, Kenneth M., eds. (1969). A History of the Crusades, Volume I: The First Hundred Years. Madison: University of Wisconsin Press. ISBN 0-299-04834-9.
- Barber, Malcolm (1994). The New Knighthood. Cambridge: Cambridge University Press. ISBN 978-1-107-60473-5.
- Burgtorf, Jochen (2008). The Central Convent of Hospitallers and Templars: History, Organization, and Personnel (1099/1120–1310). Leiden: Brill Publishers. ISBN 978-90-04-16660-8.
- Daftary, Farhad (1992). The Isma'ilis: Their History and Doctrines. Cambridge: Cambridge University Press. ISBN 978-0-521-42974-0.
- Fulton, Michael S. (2022). Contest for Egypt: The Collapse of the Fatimid Caliphate, the Ebb of Crusader Influence, and the Rise of Saladin. Leiden: Brill Publishers. ISBN 978-90-04-51227-6.
- Fulton, Michael S. (2018). Artillery in the Era of the Crusades: Siege Warfare and the Development of Trebuchet Technology. Leiden: Brill Publishers. ISBN 978-90-04-34945-2.
- Howarth, Stephen (1982). The Knights Templar. New York: Barnes and Noble. ISBN 0-88029-663-1.
- Lev, Yaacov (1991). State and Society in Fatimid Egypt. Leiden: Brill Publishers. ISBN 978-9004093447.
- Nicholson, Helen (2001). The Knights Templar: A New History. Stroud: Sutton Publishing. ISBN 0-7509-2517-5.
- Philips, Jonathan; Hoch, Martin, eds. (2001). The Second Crusade: Scope and Consequences. Manchester: Manchester University Press. ISBN 0-7190-5710-8.
- Pryor, John H. (1988). Geography, technology, and war: Studies in the maritime history of the Mediterranean, 649–1571. Cambridge: Cambridge University Press. ISBN 0-521-34424-7.
- Riley-Smith, Jonathan, ed. (1995). The Oxford Illustrated History of the Crusades. Oxford: Oxford University Press. ISBN 978-0-19-285428-5.
- Riley-Smith, Jonathan (2012). The Knights Hospitaller in the Levant, c. 1070–1309. Palgrave Macmillian. ISBN 978-0-230-29083-9.
- Runciman, Steven (1951). A History of the Crusades, Volume II: The Kingdom of Jerusalem and the Frankish East, 1100–1187. Cambridge: Cambridge University Press. ISBN 0-521-06162-8.
- Smail, R. C. (1956). Crusading Warfare 1097–1193. Cambridge: Cambridge University Press. ISBN 1-56619-769-4.
- William of Tyre. A History of Deeds Done Beyond the Sea. Edited and translated by E. A. Babcock and A. C. Krey. Columbia University Press, 1943.
