= Al-Fa'iz bi-Nasr Allah =

Imam and Fatimid Dynasty Caliph from 1154 to 1160

al-Fa'iz bi-Nasr Allah الفائز بنصر الله
- Caliph; Amir al-Mu'minīn

Imam–Caliph of the Fatimid Caliphate
- Reign: 1154–1160
- Predecessor: al-Zafir
- Successor: al-Adid
- Born: 31 May 1149
- Died: 22 July 1160 (aged 11)
- Dynasty: Fatimid
- Father: al-Zafir
- Religion: Ismaili Shia Islam

Abūʾl-Qāsim ʿĪsā ibn al-Ẓāfir (Arabic: أبو القاسم عيسى بن الظافر; 1149–1160), better known by his regnal name al-Fāʾiz bi-Naṣr Allāh (الفائز بنصر الله), was the thirteenth and penultimate Fatimid caliph, reigning in Egypt from 1154 to 1160, and the 23rd imam of the Hafizi Ismaili branch of Shi'a Islam. Al-Fa'iz was raised to the throne at the age of five after the murder of his father by the vizier Abbas ibn Abi al-Futuh, and spent his entire life as a puppet of Abbas' successor, Tala'i ibn Ruzzik. Experiencing epileptic seizures, al-Fa'iz died from an episode at the age of eleven, and his cousin, al-Adid, the last Fatimid caliph, succeeded him.

== Life ==
The future al-Fa'iz was born as Abu'l-Qasim Isa, the son of the twelfth imam–caliph of the Fatimid Caliphate, al-Zafir. Isa was raised to the throne on 16 April 1154 at the age of five, after the murder of his father and two of his uncles, by the vizier, Abbas ibn Abi al-Futuh, and his son, Nasr. He was given the regnal name al-Fāʾiz bi-Naṣr Allāh, 'Victorious with God's Help'. The sight of his uncle's corpses, and the loud cries of acclamation from the assembled troops of the Fatimid army frightened the young boy. Throughout his life, the common belief was that his subsequent epileptic seizures and tremors were a result of these traumatic experiences. For the same reason, his role in public ceremonies was limited; the annual ceremony celebrating the flooding of the Nile was even held at night during his reign.

The bloody events soon resulted in Abbas' own downfall. Terrified women in the Fatimid family called upon the Armenian-born governor of Asyut, Tala'i ibn Ruzzik, for assistance, reportedly sending their own cut hair in supplication. Ibn Ruzzik readily agreed and marched on Cairo. Abbas tried to resist, but faced general opposition: most of the troops were reluctant to support him or defected outright, and the remainder found themselves under attack by the populace with stones. In the end, on 29 May Abbas had to force his way out of the capital with his son and a handful of followers. The party made for Syria but was intercepted on 6 June by the Crusaders near the Dead Sea. Abbas was killed, and Nasr was sold to the Fatimids; he was mutilated and beaten to death by the palace women.

Ibn Ruzzik was named vizier with plenipotentiary powers on 17 June, while the underage al-Fa'iz was placed under the tutelage of his aunts, headed by al-Zafir's sister Sitt al-Qusur ('Lady of the Palaces'), who had played a leading role in securing revenge against Abbas and Nasr for the murder of her brothers. Outside the walls of the Great Fatimid Palaces, Ibn Ruzzik was the actual ruler of the state, and al-Fa'iz was virtually his prisoner. A Twelver Shi'ite, he actively sponsored the Alid ashraf in the Hijaz and Iraq, but he made no attempt to depose the Fatimid dynasty, instead ruling on its behalf as a de facto king in the style of the all-powerful and illustrious Armenian viziers Badr al-Jamali and al-Afdal Shahanshah, whom he attempted to emulate.

Ibn Ruzzik's position was not without its challenges: in 1155, and again in 1157, he faced uprisings against him by provincial governors. Seeking to bolster his legitimacy, Ibn Ruzzik returned to an aggressive policy against the Crusaders in Palestine. He scored some successes with a naval attack on Tyre in 1155 and with raids at Gaza and Hebron in 1157 and 1158, but his efforts to secure Egypt through an alliance with the Zengids of Syria under Nur al-Din Zangi failed. When Baldwin III of Jerusalem prepared an invasion of Egypt in 1160, he had to be bought off. Ibn Ruzzik's reputation as a holy warrior, a poet, and a patron of culture was counterbalanced by his despotic rule, resorting to confiscations to address the by now chronic shortfalls of revenue, exacerbated by the active pursuit of the war against the Crusaders.

Al-Fa'iz died during an epileptic seizure on 22 July 1160. Ibn Ruzzik chose another underage child to succeed him; al-Fa'iz's nine-year-old cousin al-Adid, who was wed to one of the vizier's daughters for good measure. He was to be the last Fatimid caliph.

== See also ==
- List of rulers of Egypt

== Sources ==
- Brett, Michael (2017). The Fatimid Empire. The Edinburgh History of the Islamic Empires. Edinburgh: Edinburgh University Press. ISBN 978-0-7486-4076-8.
- Cortese, Delia; Calderini, Simonetta (2006). Women and the Fatimids in the World of Islam. Edinburgh: Edinburgh University Press. ISBN 0-7486-1733-7.
- Daftary, Farhad (2007). The Ismāʿı̄lı̄s: Their History and Doctrines (Second ed.). Cambridge: Cambridge University Press. ISBN 978-0-521-61636-2.
- Halm, Heinz (2014). Kalifen und Assassinen: Ägypten und der vordere Orient zur Zeit der ersten Kreuzzüge, 1074–1171 [Caliphs and Assassins: Egypt and the Near East at the Time of the First Crusades, 1074–1171] (in German). Munich: C. H. Beck. doi:10.17104/9783406661648-1. ISBN 978-3-406-66163-1.

Preceded by al-Zafir bi-Amr Allah	Fatimid Caliph; 16 April 1154 – 22 July 1160	Succeeded by al-Adid li-Din Allah
Preceded by al-Zafir bi-Amr Allah	Imam of Hafizi Isma'ilism; 16 April 1154 – 22 July 1160	Succeeded by al-Adid li-Din Allah
