= Fakhr al-Mulk (Buyid vizier) =

Abu Ghalib Muhammad ibn Ali ibn Khalaf, better known by his honorific title of Fakhr al-Mulk (Arabic: فخر الملك) was an official and vizier of the Buyid dynasty.

Fakhr al-Mulk was born on 27 April 965 at Wasit, as the son of a moneychanger. He entered government service under the Buyid dynasty that ruled Iraq and much of the Middle East at the time, and in 999/1000 was appointed by Baha al-Dawla deputy to the vizier al-Muwaffaq at Shiraz. He was raised to the vizierate himself in autumn 1002, succeeding Hasan ibn Ustadh-Hurmuz, who was sent to Baghdad as governor and vizier of Iraq. At Shiraz, Fakhr al-Mulk led a campaign against the rebels Ibn Wasil and Hilal ibn Badr, and was imprisoned briefly in 1002. After Hasan ibn Ustadh-Hurmuz died in 1011, Fakhr al-Mulk succeeded him as vizier at Baghdad, until he was executed by Sultan al-Dawla on 3 or 6 September 1016. During his tenure in Baghdad, Fakhr al-Mulk distinguished himself as a patron of culture and for restoring peace to the troubled city. Several of the poets he had patronized composed eulogies in his name, while the mathematician al-Karaji dedicated two of his works to him.

His son, Abu Shuja Muhammad al-Ashraf, was briefly vizier of the Fatimid caliph al-Mustansir Billah in 1064/5.

== Sources ==
- Busse, Heribert (2004) [1969]. Chalif und Grosskönig - Die Buyiden im Irak (945-1055) [Caliph and Great King - The Buyids in Iraq (945-1055)] (in German). Würzburg: Ergon Verlag. ISBN 3-89913-005-7.
- Kennedy, Hugh (2004). The Prophet and the Age of the Caliphates: The Islamic Near East from the 6th to the 11th Century (Second ed.). Harlow: Longman. ISBN 978-0-582-40525-7.
- Saleh, Abdel Hamid (2002). "Ibn Ḵh̲alaf". In Bearman, P. J.; Bianquis, Th.; Bosworth, C. E.; van Donzel, E. & Heinrichs, W. P. (eds.). The Encyclopaedia of Islam, Second Edition. Volume XI: W–Z. Leiden: E. J. Brill. p. 390. doi:10.1163/1573-3912_islam_SIM_8656. ISBN 978-90-04-12756-2.
