= Vizier (Fatimid Caliphate) =

Title for senior minister of the Fatimid Egyptian period

The vizier (Arabic: وزير, romanized: wazīr) was the senior minister of the Fatimid Caliphate for most of the Egyptian period of its existence. Originally it was held by civilian officials who acted as the chief civilian ministers of the caliphs, analogous to the original model established by the Abbasids. When a vizier was not appointed, an "intermediary" (wāsiṭa) was designated instead. The enfeeblement of the caliph's power and the crisis of the Fatimid regime under Caliph al-Mustansir, however, led to the rise of military strongmen, who dominated the post from the 1070s until the caliphate's end. These "viziers of the sword" were also commanders-in-chief of the army who effectively sidelined the caliphs and ruled in their stead, often seizing power from their predecessors. The last vizier, Saladin, abolished the Fatimid Caliphate in 1171 (see Saladin in Egypt).

== History and powers ==
During the Ifriqiyan period of the Fatimid Caliphate (909–973), the title of "vizier", although current in the eastern Islamic world, was not used. It was adopted after the Fatimid conquest of Egypt, where the office had had a long tradition under the autonomous Tulunid and Ikhshidid dynasties. Although the last Ikhshidid vizier, Ja'far ibn al-Furat, continued to exercise many of his previous functions, the conqueror and viceroy of Egypt, Jawhar, refused to recognize his possession of the vizieral title. Likewise, when Caliph al-Mu'izz li-Din Allah (r. 953–975) arrived in Egypt, he preferred to avoid delegating his powers to a vizier, although he appointed Ya'qub ibn Killis, a former Ikhshidid official, as head of the administrative apparatus. It was only c. 979 that Caliph al-Aziz Billah (r. 975–996) gave the title of vizier to Ibn Killis, who continued as head of the administration until his death in 991.

After Ibn Killis, the caliphs could choose whether to appoint a vizier, or entrust affairs to an "intermediary" (wāsiṭa) who mediated between the Caliph and his officials and subjects. In line with the Fatimids' general policy of toleration of Christians and Jews, several viziers were Christians or of Christian origin, beginning with Isa ibn Nasturus under al-Aziz. Jews, on the other hand, only appear to have held the office after converting to Islam, Ibn Killis being the most prominent example.

The early viziers served at the pleasure of the caliph who had appointed them, and exemplified what the 11th-century legal theorist al-Mawardi called wazīr al-tanfīdh ("vizier of execution"), effectively being, in the description of the Orientalist Marius Canard, "agents for the execution of the sovereign's will". Indeed, their careers were often very brief, being deposed, imprisoned, beaten, and frequently executed, by the caliph or by other court rivals. As a result, according to Canard, "broadly speaking, the main characteristic of the vizierate of the Fatimids is the insecurity of the viziers", with periods where the office changed hands in rapid succession. Under the weak al-Mustansir, five viziers held office between 1060 and 1062 alone.

This changed with the rise of the military strongmen to the position: Badr al-Jamali and his successors held full powers in the caliph's stead, and represented al-Mawardi's wazīr al-tafwīd, the "vizier with delegated powers". Due to the military background of the holders of the vizierate, they were also known as "viziers of the sword and pen" (wazīr al-sayf wa'l-qalam), or simply "viziers of the sword" (wazīr al-sayf). The "viziers of the sword", who dominated the last century of the Caliphate's existence, were at the same time chief ministers in charge of all civil administration, heads of the armies (amīr al-juyūsh), responsible for all judicial matters as chief qāḍī, and even for all religious matters as head missionary (dāʿī al-duʿāt). As the viziers' power grew to eclipse the caliphs', they even assumed the title of "king" (al-malik) followed by an epithet. (Note: With the assumption of the vizierate first by Shirkuh, and then by his nephew Saladin, this practice passed on to all later Ayyubid rulers.)

From the early 12th century on, the position of ṣāḥib al-bāb or high chamberlain was created and came immediately after the vizier, taking over some of the latter's duties when the vizier was not a "man of the sword". Described as a "second vizierate", the office served as a springboard for the actual vizierate for Abu'l-Fath Yanis, Ridwan ibn Walakhshi and Dirgham.

== Residences ==
Ibn Killis established his official residence (dār al-wazāra) in the southeastern part of Cairo, close to the Sa'ada Gate, a quarter which became known as al-wazīriyya after Ibn Killis. The building was not only the residence of the vizier, but also the seat of the fiscal bureaus (dīwāns), and housed storage rooms for garments, the treasury, books, and drinks. Each of the latter was supervised by a comptroller (nāẓir), and the dār al-wazāra itself also had its own superintendent (zimām). The dār al-wazāra was an echo of the caliphal palaces, and included a small mosque for prayer and kitchens for the banquets organized by the vizier. According to the 15th-century historian al-Maqrizi, after Ibn Killis' death, his residence was not occupied again by a vizier until Abu Muhammad al-Yazuri in 1050. It was then that it became a true dār al-wazāra, being the official residence of the subsequent holders of the office until Badr al-Jamali.

Badr built a new residence to the north, in the quarter of Barjawān. This edifice then passed into the hands of his son and successor al-Afdal Shahanshah, and then to another of Badr's sons, al-Muzaffar Ja'far; from him it was later known dār al-Muẓaffar. Later converted to a guest-house, it was here that the deposed Fatimids were held by Saladin after the overthrow of the dynasty in 1171. Al-Afdal also built a new, and much larger and more luxurious dār al-wazāra, on the northeastern part of the city, near the Bab al-Nasr. Initially called dār al-Afḍaliyya, it was commonly known as the "House of the Domes" (dār al-qibāb), and later, under al-Ma'mun al-Bata'ihi, as dār al-wazāra al-kubrā ("grand house of the vizierate"). This was the final residence of the Fatimid viziers until the end of the dynasty.

== List of viziers ==
Start	End	Name	Notes	Caliph	Refs
979	983	Ya'qub ibn Killis	Jewish convert of Iraqi origin	al-Aziz Billah (975–996)	
983	983	Jabr ibn al-Qasim	An Isma'ili official from the Maghreb, served as vizier for three months during Ibn Killis' disgrace and imprisonment.	al-Aziz Billah (975–996)	
983	990	Ya'qub ibn Killis	Restored to office	al-Aziz Billah (975–996)	
990	991	Abu'l-Hasan Ali ibn Umar al-Addas	Not vizier, but "guarantor" (ḍāmin) of the state affairs after Ibn Killis' death. Dismissed and imprisoned due to mismanagement.	al-Aziz Billah (975–996)	
992	993	Abu'l-Fadl Ja'far ibn al-Fadl ibn al-Furat	Sunni official of Iraqi origin, from a long line of Abbasid viziers; he had served as vizier under the last Ikhshidids and was retained after the conquest of Egypt.	al-Aziz Billah (975–996)	
993	996	Isa ibn Nasturus ibn Surus	A Coptic Egyptian scribe, known for his efficiency in tax collection. Executed by Caliph al-Hakim in 1000.	al-Aziz Billah (975–996)	
996	997	Muhammad al-Hasan ibn Abbar ibn Abi'l-Husayn	A Kutama nobleman, resigned after clashes between the Turkish and Maghrebi army factions. The first to receive an honorific title, amīn al-dawla ("trusted servant of the realm").	al-Hakim bi-Amr Allah (996–1021)	
997	999	Barjawan	An Isma'ili eunuch slave from Sicily, designated as tutor of al-Hakim by al-Aziz, but coming to power only after the departure of Ibn Ammar. His great power led him to be killed on al-Hakim's orders.	al-Hakim bi-Amr Allah (996–1021)	
999	1002	al-Husayn ibn Jawhar	Son of Jawhar, the conqueror of Egypt. Co-vizier with Fahd ibn Ibrahim, bore the title "chief commander" (qāʿid al-quwwād).	al-Hakim bi-Amr Allah (996–1021)	
999	1002	Abu'l-Ala Fahd ibn Ibrahim	A Christian scribe from Egypt. Co-vizier with al-Husayn ibn Jawhar, bore the title al-raʿīs ("the chief" or "the headsman"). Murdered by Caliph al-Hakim.	al-Hakim bi-Amr Allah (996–1021)	
1002	1010	position vacant		al-Hakim bi-Amr Allah (996–1021)	
1010	1012	Zar'ah ibn Isa ibn Nasturus	Son of vizier Isa ibn Nasturus, bore the title of al-shāfi ("the healer").	al-Hakim bi-Amr Allah (996–1021)	
1012	1014	al-Husayn ibn Tahir al-Wazzan	Scribe of Iranian origin. Not a vizier, but wāsiṭa ("intermediary") with the title of amīn al-umanāʾ ("chief secretary", lit. '"secretary of secretaries"'). Killed by Caliph al-Hakim in person.	al-Hakim bi-Amr Allah (996–1021)	
1014	1014	al-Hasan ibn Abi al-Sayyid and Abd al-Rahman ibn Abi al-Sayyid	Brothers, officials of unknown origin, held the post of wāsiṭa in tandem. Despite a reputation for honesty, both were killed by the Caliph after 62 days in office.	al-Hakim bi-Amr Allah (996–1021)	
1014	1014	Abu'l-Abbas al-Fadl ibn Ja'far ibn al-Fadl ibn al-Furat	Son of vizier Ja'far ibn al-Furat, in office as wāsiṭa for five days before being killed on the Caliph's orders.	al-Hakim bi-Amr Allah (996–1021)	
1015	1018	Abu'l-Hasan Ali ibn Ja'far ibn Falah	Son of the Kutama general Ja'far ibn Falah and close friend and favourite of al-Hakim. ALongside the vizierate he was governor of Alexandria, Tinnis, and Damietta, as well as police prefect (ṣāḥib al-shurṭa) and inspector of the marketplaces (ḥisbah). He was assassinated on the Caliph's orders while riding home. Received the honorifics of wāzir al-wuzarāʾ ("chief vizier", lit. '"vizier of viziers"'), dhū'l-riāsatayn ("the one of the two headships"), al-amīr al-muzaffar ("victorious commander"), and quṭb al-dawla ("axis of the realm").	al-Hakim bi-Amr Allah (996–1021)	
1018	1018	Sa'id ibn Isa ibn Nasturus	Son of vizier Isa ibn Nasturus and brother of Zar'ah ibn Nasturus. He held extensive powers as "sharer of the caliphate" (qāsim al-khilāfah), with the titles of al-amīn al-ẓahir ("the outer secretary"), sharaf al-mulk ("honour of the kingship"), tāj al-maʿālī ("crown of the finances"), and dhū'l-jādayn ("the one of the two hands"). Executed after five months in office.	al-Hakim bi-Amr Allah (996–1021)	
1018	1019	Abu'l-Fath al-Mas'ud ibn Tahir al-Wazzan	Brother of vizier al-Husayn ibn Tahir al-Wazzan. 1st tenure, as wāsiṭa rather than full vizier.	al-Hakim bi-Amr Allah (996–1021)	
1020	1021	Abu'l-Husayn Ammar ibn Muhammad	Isma'ili official, served as wāsiṭa with the titles of al-amīr al-khaṭīr ("the significant commander") and raʿīs al-ruʿasāʾ ("chief headsman", lit. '"head of heads"'). He was in office during al-Hakim's disappearance and supervised the accession of al-Zahir, but was executed a few days after completing seven months in office.	al-Hakim bi-Amr Allah (996–1021)	
1020	1021	Abu'l-Husayn Ammar ibn Muhammad	Isma'ili official, served as wāsiṭa with the titles of al-amīr al-khaṭīr ("the significant commander") and raʿīs al-ruʿasāʾ ("chief headsman", lit. '"head of heads"'). He was in office during al-Hakim's disappearance and supervised the accession of al-Zahir, but was executed a few days after completing seven months in office.	Al-Zahir li-i'zaz Din Allah (1021–1036)	
1022	1022	Musa ibn al-Hasan	In office for nine months as wāsiṭa with the titles of yadd al-dawla ("hand of the realm") and abū'l-futūḥ ("father of victories"), before being deposed, imprisoned, and executed.	Al-Zahir li-i'zaz Din Allah (1021–1036)	
1023	1024	Abu'l-Fath al-Mas'ud ibn Tahir al-Wazzan	Second tenure, as full vizier	Al-Zahir li-i'zaz Din Allah (1021–1036)	
1024	1027	Abu Muhammad al-Hasan ibn Salih al-Ruzbari	A veteran official, served as governor of Ramla and Syria and head of the army bureau before being appointed vizier with the title of ʿamīd al-dawla wa naṣīḥuhā ("support and councillor of the realm"). Despite his advanced age, he was mistreated by the Caliph, who dismissed him and then restored him to office, only to dismiss him again.	Al-Zahir li-i'zaz Din Allah (1021–1036)	
1027	1045	Abu'l-Qasim Ali ibn Ahmad al-Jarjara'i	Member of an Iraqi family which moved to Egypt and became an administrator. Complaints against him led Caliph al-Hakim to cut off his hands, but al-Zahir appointed him vizier. He was in office when al-Zahir died, and supervised the accession of al-Mustansir, serving as his vizier until his death. He bore the titles al-wazīr al-ajall ("the most illustrious vizier"), al-awḥad ("the unique"), and ṣafī amīr al-muʿminīn wa khāliṣatuh ("the true and chosen friend of the commander of the faithful").	Al-Zahir li-i'zaz Din Allah (1021–1036)	
1027	1045	Abu'l-Qasim Ali ibn Ahmad al-Jarjara'i	Member of an Iraqi family which moved to Egypt and became an administrator. Complaints against him led Caliph al-Hakim to cut off his hands, but al-Zahir appointed him vizier. He was in office when al-Zahir died, and supervised the accession of al-Mustansir, serving as his vizier until his death. He bore the titles al-wazīr al-ajall ("the most illustrious vizier"), al-awḥad ("the unique"), and ṣafī amīr al-muʿminīn wa khāliṣatuh ("the true and chosen friend of the commander of the faithful").	al-Mustansir Billah (1036–1094)	
1045	1047	Abu Mansur Sadaqah ibn Yusuf al-Falahi	A Jewish convert, he was a close friend and aide of al-Jarjara'i, who nominated him as his successor. Nevertheless, he was obliged to share his office with Abu Sa'd al-Tustari, the steward of the Caliph's mother. He managed to have his rival eliminated, but as himself soon after deposed and killed at the instigation of al-Muntasir's mother. He bore the titles al-wazīr al-ajall, tāj al-riyāsa ("crown of the leadership"), fakhr al-mulk ("glory of the kingship"), and muṣṭafā amīr al-muʿminīn ("the chosen one of the commander of the faithful").	al-Mustansir Billah (1036–1094)	
1045	1047	Abu Sa'd al-Tustari	The original owner of al-Muntasir's mother, he later became her chief steward. He was killed at the instigation of his co-vizier.	al-Mustansir Billah (1036–1094)	
1048	1049	Abu'l-Barakat al-Husayn al-Jarjara'i	Brother of the vizier Ali ibn Ahmad al-Jarjara'i, he was unpopular as he sent many into exile or prison and confiscated their properties. He was imprisoned and then exiled to Syria at the Caliph's orders. He bore the honorifics sayyid al-wuzarāʾ ("lord of viziers"), ẓahīr al-aʿimmah ("helper of the imams"), samāʾ al-khulaṣāʾ ("sky of the sincere ones"), and fakhr al-ummah ("glory of the [Muslim] community").	al-Mustansir Billah (1036–1094)	
1049	1050	Abu'l-Fadl Sa'id ibn Masud	A career scribe, he was head of the bureau of Syria before being appointed as wāsiṭa, with the titles ʿamīd al-mulk ("support of the kingship") and zayn al-kufāt ("ornament of the capable ones").	al-Mustansir Billah (1036–1094)	
1050	1058	Abu Muhammad al-Hasan ibn ali ibn Abd al-Rahman al-Yazuri	Of lowly origin, he rose quickly to prominence as steward of al-Mustansir's mother, and was appointed vizier during a period of severe crisis. As a result, he was able to extract several concessions from al-Mustansir, who was eager to distance himself from governance: although he was a Sunni, al-Yazuri was named chief Isma'ili missionary (dāʿī al-duʿāt). After subduing an Arab revolt, his name was included on the coins alongside the Caliph's. He was imprisoned and executed on the Caliph's orders after depleting the treasury, at a time when Egypt suffered from famine, pursuing his ambition of capturing Baghdad and finally replacing the Abbasid Caliphate with the Fatimids. He held the titles of al-wazīr al-ajall, al-awḥad, al-makīn ("the firm one"), sayyid al-wuzarāʾ, tāj al-aṣfiyāʾ ("crown of the pure ones"), qāḍī al-quḍāt ("chief judge", lit. '"qāḍī' of qāḍīs") and dāʿī al-duʿāt ("chief missionary", lit. '"dāʿī' of dāʿīs"), ʿalam al-majd ("world of glory") and khāliṣat amīr al-muʿminīn ("chosen one of the commander of the faithful").	al-Mustansir Billah (1036–1094)	
1058	1058	Abu'l-Faraj Abdallah ibn Muhammad al-Babili	A mathematician and author who worked as scribe for al-Yazuri. He briefly succeeded him as vizier for the first of three tenures, lasting two months and 14 days. He bore the titles al-wazīr al-ajall, al-asʿad ("the auspicious"), al-makīn, al-ḥāfiz ("the protector"), al-amjad ("the glorious"), al-amīn ("the trustworthy one"), ʿamīd al-khilāfah ("support of the caliphate"), jalāl al-wuzarāʾ ("glory of the viziers"), tāj al-mamlaka ("crown of the kingdom"), wazīr al-imāama ("councillor of the imamate"), sharaf al-milla ("honour of the religion"), kafīl al-dīn ("patron of the Faith"), khalīl amīr al-muʿminīn wa khāliṣatuh ("the true and chosen beloved of the commander of the faithful").	al-Mustansir Billah (1036–1094)	
1058	1060	Abu'l-Faraj Muhammad ibn Ja'far al-Maghribi	An official under al-Yazuri and imprisoned by al-Babili, he was appointed to the vizierate after al-Babili's dismissal. He was the first to be re-employed after his dismissal two years later, being appointed head of the chancery (dīwān al-inshāʾ). He bore the titles of al-wazīr al-ajall, al-kāmil ("the perfect one"), al-awḥad, and ṣafī amīr al-muʿminīn wa khāliṣatuh.	al-Mustansir Billah (1036–1094)	
1060	1060	Abu'l-Faraj Abdallah ibn Muhammad al-Babili	Second tenure as vizier, for four months and ten days.	al-Mustansir Billah (1036–1094)	
1061	1061	Abdallah ibn Yahya ibn Mudabbir	Scion of a line of Abbasid viziers and a learned Sufi. His first tenure was of short duration. He bore the titles of al-wazīr al-ajall, al-ʿādil ("the just"), al-amīr ("the commander"), sharaf al-wuzarāʾ ("honour of the viziers"), sayyid al-ruʿasāʾ ("lord of the headsmen"), tāj al-aṣfiyā, ʿizz al-dīn ("glory of the Faith"), mughīth al-Muslimīn ("succourer of the Muslims"), and khalīl amīr al-muʿminīn ("beloved of the commander of the faithful").	al-Mustansir Billah (1036–1094)	
1061	1062	Abd al-Karim ibn Abd al-Hakim	The scion of a Syrian family of qāḍīs, his tenure lasted for five months, cut short by his death. He held the titles of al-wazīr al-ajall, fakhr al-wuzarāʾ ("glory of the viziers"), ʿamīd al-ruʿasāʾ ("dean of the headsmen"), qāḍī al-quḍāt wa dāʿī al-duʿāt, majd al-maʿālī ("glorious excellency"), kafīl al-dīn, and yamīn al-muʿminīn ("right hand of the commander of the faithful").	al-Mustansir Billah (1036–1094)	
1062	1062	Abu Ali Ahmad ibn Abd al-Hakim	A qāḍī and son of the vizier Abd al-Karim ibn Abd al-Hakim, becoming thus the first Fatimid vizier to succeed his father. Died after 17 days in office, probably of natural causes. Other than a reputation for piousness, his life is unknown. He held the titles of al-wazīr al-ajall, qāḍī al-quḍāt wa dāʿī al-duʿāt, thiqat al-Muslimīn ("the one trusted by the Muslims"), and khalīl amīr al-muʿminīn.	al-Mustansir Billah (1036–1094)	
1062	1062	Abu Abdallah al-Husayn ibn Sadid	An official from Damascus, he held the office for six months before being dismissed and returning to Syria as its governor. He held the titles of al-wazīr al-sayyid al-ajall, al-kāmil, and al-awḥad.	al-Mustansir Billah (1036–1094)	
1062	1062	Abu'l-Faraj Abdallah ibn Muhammad al-Babili	Third tenure, for five months, until his death.	al-Mustansir Billah (1036–1094)	
1063		Abu Ahmad Ahmad ibn Abd al-Karim ibn Abd al-Hakim	Two tenures, for three and a half months in total, alternating with the office of qāḍī al-quḍāt. He had the titles of al-wazīr al-ajall, al-awḥad, sayyid al-wuzarāʾ, majd al-aṣfiyāʾ ("exaltation of the pure ones"), and qāḍī al-quḍāt wa dāʿī al-duʿāt.	al-Mustansir Billah (1036–1094)	
1063		Abdallah ibn Yahya ibn Mudabbir	Second and brief tenure, cut short by his death.	al-Mustansir Billah (1036–1094)	
1063		Abu Ghalib Abd al-Zahir ibn Fadl ibn al-Ajami	First tenure for three months. He bore the titles of al-wazīr al-ajall, al-awḥad, al-asʿad, tāj al-wuzarāʾ ("crown of the viziers"), al-amīn, al-makīn, sharaf al-kufāt ("honour of the capable ones"), dhū'l-mafākhir ("the prideful one"), and khalīl amīr al-muʿminīn.	al-Mustansir Billah (1036–1094)	
1063		al-Hasan ibn al-Qadi ibn Kudaynah	First of five tenures held between 1063 and 1073, along with holding the office of qāḍī al-quḍāt six times. He is remembered as a cruel and tyrannical man. He held the titles al-wazīr al-ajall, al-awḥad, jalāl al-Islām ("glory of Islam"), ẓāhir al-imām ("the external [representative] of the Imam"), qāḍī al-quḍāt wa dāʿī al-duʿāt, sharaf al-majd, and khalīl amīr al-muʿminīn.	al-Mustansir Billah (1036–1094)	
1064		Abu'l-Makarim al-Musharraf ibn As'ad al-Babili	First tenure of two months. He bore the titles of al-wazīr al-ajall, al-ʿādil, and khalīl amīr al-muʿminīn.	al-Mustansir Billah (1036–1094)	
1064		Abu Ali al-Hasan ibn Abi Sa'd Ibrahim ibn Sahl al-Tustari	From a wealthy merchant family, he was head of the treasury before becoming vizier, at the turn of AH 456/457. He resigned after only ten days. As a result, he only bore the titles al-ʿamīd and ʿalam al-kufāt ("world of the capable ones").	al-Mustansir Billah (1036–1094)	
1064		Abu Ghalib Abd al-Zahir ibn Fadl ibn al-Ajami	Second tenure of 34 days.	al-Mustansir Billah (1036–1094)	
1065		Abu'l-Makarim al-Musharraf ibn As'ad	Second tenure for less than two months.	al-Mustansir Billah (1036–1094)	
1065		Abu'l-Qasim Hibat Allah ibn Muhammad al-Ra'yani	Two tenures of ten days each. He held the titles of al-wazīr al-ajall, sayyid al-wuzarāʾ, tāj al-aṣfiyāʾ, and dhukrat amīr al-muʿminīn ("treasured friend of the commander of the faithful").	al-Mustansir Billah (1036–1094)	
1065		Abu'l-Hasan ali ibn al-Anbari	Deposed, and possibly killed, after less than a month in office. He held the titles of al-athīr ("the ethereal one") and kāfī al-kufāt ("the most capable one").	al-Mustansir Billah (1036–1094)	
1065		Abu Ali al-Hasan ibn Sadid al-Dawla Dhu'l-Kafalatayn	Vizier for a few days. He left the office due to the lack of respect shown him by officials and the dire sttae of the realm, and went to Syria. He returned to Egypt only later, dying shortly after. He held the titles of al-wazīr al-ajall, tāj al-riyāsa, ʿalam al-dīn ("world of the Faith"), and sayyid al-sādāt ("the supreme lord", lit. '"lord of lords"').	al-Mustansir Billah (1036–1094)	
1065		Abu Shuja Muhammad al-Ashraf	The son of Fakhr al-Mulk, a vizier under the Buyid sultan Baha al-Dawla, he was very wealthy and renowned for his integrity. His first tenure in December 1064 only lasted two days, and his second, in January–February 1065, about a month. In 1073 left for Syria, but was intercepted and executed by Badr al-Jamali. He bore the titles of al-ajall, al-muʿaẓẓam ("the exalted one"), and fakhr al-mulk.	al-Mustansir Billah (1036–1094)	
1066		Abu'l-Hasan Tahir ibn Wazir	A scribe in the chancery, he served as vizier for a few days before abandoning his post for his home city of Tripoli. He bore the titles al-ajall, al-wajīh ("the dignified"), sayyid al-kufāt ("lord of the capable ones"), nafīs al-dawla ("priceless [servant] of the realm"), and ẓahīr amīr al-muʿminīn ("helper of the commander of the faithful").	al-Mustansir Billah (1036–1094)	
1066		Abu Abdallah Muhammad ibn Abi Hamid	Scion of a wealthy Egyptian family from Tinnis, he was vizier for one day, before being dismissed and executed by the Caliph. He held the titles of al-qadīr ("the mighty"), al-ʿādil, shams al-umam ("sun of the nations", sayyid ruʿasāʾ al-sayf wa'l-qalam ("lord of the headsmen of the sword and the pen"), tāj al-ʿulā ("the highest crown"), ʿamīd al-hudā ("support of guidance"), sharaf al-dīn ("honour of the Faith"), ghayyāth al-Islām wa'l-Muslimīn ("succorer of Islam and the Muslims"), ḥamīm amīr al-muʿminīn ("intimate [friend] of the commander of the faithful").	al-Mustansir Billah (1036–1094)	
1066		Abu Sa'd Mansur ibn Zunbur	An Egyptian Christian, he was vizier for a few days before he fled the office when the army demanded to be paid, as the treasury was empty. He bore the titles of al-ajall, al-awḥad, al-makīn, al-sayyid, al-afḍal ("the best, the superior"), al-amīn, sharaf al-kufāt, ʿamīd al-khilāfah, muḥibb amīr al-muʿminīn ("lover of the commander of the faithful").	al-Mustansir Billah (1036–1094)	
1066	1073	The exact history of the viziers during this period is unclear as they alternated often and with extremely short tenures, so that many were never even recorded, while others, like Ibn Kudaynah, held the office multiple times.		al-Mustansir Billah (1036–1094)	
1072	1072	Abu Ghalib Abd al-Zahir ibn Fadl ibn al-Ajami	Third and last tenure, amidst a collapsing regime and a famine so severe that cannibalism was reported. He was killed after a few days.	al-Mustansir Billah (1036–1094)	
1073		Abu'l-Ala Abd al-Ghani ibn Nasr ibn Sa'id al-Dayf	Ibn al-Sayrafi reports that he was a wāsiṭa and in office until the arrival of Badr al-Jamali, but other authors dispute this: Ibn Muyassar reports that Abd al-Ghani only was in office for a few days, and that Ibn Kudaynah was vizier when Badr al-Jamali came to Cairo. He held the titles of al-ṣādiq ("the honest"), al-muʿmīn ("the faithful"), makīn al-dawla wa amīnuha ("firm support and servant of the realm").	al-Mustansir Billah (1036–1094)	
1073		al-Hasan ibn al-Qadi ibn Kudaynah	Fifth and final tenure, according to al-Maqrizi for about a year. He was executed by Badr al-Jamali in person.	al-Mustansir Billah (1036–1094)	
1074	1094	Badr al-Jamali	Armenian ghulām and general, served until his death. He bore the titles al-sayyid al-ajall ("the most exalted lord"), amīr al-juyūsh ("commander of the armies"), sayf al-Islām ("sword of Islam"), and nāṣir al-imām ("protector of the Imam").	al-Mustansir Billah (1036–1094)	
1094	1121	al-Afdal Shahanshah	Son of Badr al-Jamali, he succeeded his father during the last year of his life, when Badr fell ill. After the death of al-Mustansir, he orchestrated the accession of al-Mustansir's younger son al-Musta'li over his older brother Nizar. Nizar was killed in the subsequent confrontation, leading to the split between the split of the Nizari and Musta'li branches of Isma'ilism. After al-Musta'li's death, he placed his son al-Amir bi-Ahkam Allah on the throne. In foreign affairs, his tenure was dominated by his incessant campaigns against the Crusader states in the Levant. Al-Afdal remained the de facto ruler of Egypt until his assassination in 1121. He bore the titles al-sayyid al-ajall, al-afḍal, sayf al-imām ("sword of the Imam"), jalāl al-Islām, sharaf al-ānām ("honour of mankind"), nāṣir al-dīn ("protector of the Faith"), and khalīl amīr al-muʿminīn.	al-Mustansir Billah (1036–1094)	
1094	1121	al-Afdal Shahanshah		al-Musta'li (1094–1101)	
1094	1121	al-Afdal Shahanshah		Al-Amir bi-Ahkam Allah (1101–1130)	
1121	1125	Abu Abdallah al-Ma'mun al-Bata'ihi	Previously chief of staff for al-Afdal and author of several reforms, he may have been involved in the latter's assassination, along with Caliph al-Amir. As vizier, he gained a reputation for justice and generosity, and was a patron of learning; he undertook a census of Egypt, and commissioned a history of the vizierate. His downfall in 1125 was abrupt and remains a mystery, as the sources can only speculate on the reasons; likely al-Amir resented his extensive authority. Al-Bata'ihi was executed and crucified by the Caliph in 1128. He bore the titles al-sayyid al-ajall, tāj al-khilāfah ("crown of the caliphate"), ʿizz al-Islām ("glory of Islam"), fakhr al-ānām ("glory of mankind"), and niẓām al-dīn ("order of the Faith").	Al-Amir bi-Ahkam Allah (1101–1130)	
1125	1130	position vacant		Al-Amir bi-Ahkam Allah (1101–1130)	
1130	1130	Hizar al-Mulk Hazarmard	A favourite of al-Amir, he was vizier for about two weeks following the death of al-Amir and the proclamation of Abu al-Majid (the future Caliph al-Hafiz li-Din Allah) as regent. He was deposed and executed when the army rose in revolt under Kutayfat.	Regency of Abd al-Majid	
1130	1131	Abu Ali Ahmad ibn al-Afdal Shahanshah (Kutayfat)	The son of al-Afdal Shahanshah, he seized dictatorical powers after the murder of Caliph al-Amir. He kept Abd al-Majid as nominal regent, but he soon changed the official state doctrine to Twelver Imamism and ruled as the deputy (nāʾib) and deputy (khalīfa) of the Expected Imam, sidelining the Fatimids. He ruled for 13 months and 13 days before he was murdered in a coup organized by the disgruntled Fatimid elites.	Regency of Abd al-Majid	
1131	1132	Abu'l-Fath Yanis	An Armenian Christian military slave, he played the leading role in the assassination of Kutayfat and was rewarded with the position of vizier. His growing power made him a threat to the Caliph al-Hafiz, who had him killed after little over nine months in office.	Regency of Abd al-Majid	
1131	1132	Abu'l-Fath Yanis	An Armenian Christian military slave, he played the leading role in the assassination of Kutayfat and was rewarded with the position of vizier. His growing power made him a threat to the Caliph al-Hafiz, who had him killed after little over nine months in office.	al-Hafiz li-Din Allah (1132–1149)	
1132	1134	position vacant		al-Hafiz li-Din Allah (1132–1149)	
1134	1134	Sulayman ibn al-Hafiz li-Din Allah	Son and designated successor of al-Hafiz, he died two months after receiving the powers of the vizierate.	al-Hafiz li-Din Allah (1132–1149)	
1134	1134	Haydara ibn al-Hafiz li-Din Allah	A younger son of al-Hafiz, he was named designated successor and vizier after the death of Sulayman.	al-Hafiz li-Din Allah (1132–1149)	
1134	1135	Hasan ibn al-Hafiz li-Din Allah	A younger son of al-Hafiz, he forced his father to name him vizier and heir-apparent on 19 July 1135. After he killed a number of senior commanders, the army demanded his execution. Al-Hafiz had him poisoned in March/April 1135.	al-Hafiz li-Din Allah (1132–1149)	
1135	1137	Abu Muzaffar Bahram al-Armani	An Armenian Christian. The favour he showed to Christians, and especially the encouragement of Armenian immigration, led to an anti-Christian backlash among the Muslim population, and he was forced out of office in February 1137 by the Sunni Ridwan ibn Walakhshi. He bore the titles of tāj al-mulūk ("crown of the kingship") and sayf al-Islām.	al-Hafiz li-Din Allah (1132–1149)	
1137	1139	Ridwan ibn Walakhshi	A Sunni Egyptian military commander and governor of Ascalon. He was the first vizier to claim the title of al-malik ("king"). His tenure was marked by the replacement of Christian officials by Muslims, and the imposition of restrictions on Christians and Jews. Ridwan also aimed to depose the Fatimids in favour of a Sunni regime headed by himself, but was thwarted by al-Hafiz, who raised the people of Cairo and the army against him and evicted him from the capital. Ridwan surrendered and was imprisoned in the palace, only to escape and lead another rebellion in 1148, during which he was murdered on the Caliph's instructions.	al-Hafiz li-Din Allah (1132–1149)	
1138	1149	position vacant		al-Hafiz li-Din Allah (1132–1149)	
1149	1149	Najm al-Din Muhammad ibn Masal	A military commander from the Maghreb, he was "supervisor of affairs" (nāẓir fi'l-umūr) since 1145, but became vizier only after the accession of al-Zafir, holding the office for two months before being deposed and killed by al-Adil ibn al-Sallar after trying to purge the army to restore discipline in its ranks.	al-Zafir bi-Amr Allah (1149–1154)	
1149	1153	al-Adil ibn al-Sallar	He was governor of Alexandria when he deposed and replaced Ibn Masal. His tenure lasted three and a half years, during which he was scored significant successes against the Crusaders. He was murdered following a conspiracy by his own stepson, Abbas ibn Abi al-Futuh, and the latter's companion Usama ibn Munqidh.	al-Zafir bi-Amr Allah (1149–1154)	
1153	1154	Abbas ibn Abi al-Futuh	Seized power after murdering his stepfather. He had Caliph Al-Zafir assassinated and raised al-Fa'iz bi-Nasr Allah to the throne, but was himself deposed soon after.	al-Zafir bi-Amr Allah (1149–1154)	
1153	1154	Abbas ibn Abi al-Futuh	Seized power after murdering his stepfather. He had Caliph Al-Zafir assassinated and raised al-Fa'iz bi-Nasr Allah to the throne, but was himself deposed soon after.	al-Fa'iz bi-Nasr Allah (1154–1160)	
1154	1160	Tala'i ibn Ruzzik	During his long tenure, he was the de facto ruler of Egypt. He was a patron of scholars and tried to bridle the army commanders, while engaging Egypt in continuous war against the Crusaders.	al-Fa'iz bi-Nasr Allah (1154–1160)	
1154	1160	Tala'i ibn Ruzzik	During his long tenure, he was the de facto ruler of Egypt. He was a patron of scholars and tried to bridle the army commanders, while engaging Egypt in continuous war against the Crusaders.	al-Adid li-Din Allah	
1160	1162	Ruzzik ibn Tala'i	Son of Tala'i ibn Ruzzik, he was of generous disposition, giving tax exemptions and lowering fees for court cases.	al-Adid li-Din Allah	
1162	August 1163	Shawar ibn Mujir al-Sa'di	Sunni Arab military officer, together with Dirgham he killed Ruzzik ibn Tala'i. He rose to the vizierate at a time when the Fatimid regime had virtually collapsed, and the caliph become a purely symbolic presence amidst the infighting of various military commanders.	al-Adid li-Din Allah	
31 August 1163	May/June or July/August 1164	Dirgham ibn Amir ibn Suqar al-Lukhami	Sunni military officer from Yemen, a distinguished warrior and poet, he rose to high offices under Tala'i and Ruzzik. He led the army in a revolt against Shawar, who was ousted and fled to Syria. Dirgham became vizier with the title al-malik al-manṣūr ("victorious king"), but was unable to secure broad backing for his regime. When Shawar returned with the aid of Shirkuh, he defeated Dirgham's forces, and numerous defections began. Dirgham was captured and killed while fleeing Cairo in May/June or July/August 1164.	al-Adid li-Din Allah	
1163	1168	Shawar ibn Mujir al-Sa'di	Restored for a second tenure, he was unable to master the crisis resulting from the Crusader invasion and the military factionalism in the capital. As a result, he called in Shirkuh for aid.	al-Adid li-Din Allah	
1168	1169	Asad al-Din Shirkuh	A Kurdish general of the Zengids, called in to assist Shawar and became vizier as a reward after repelling the Crusaders. He died in office after two months.	al-Adid li-Din Allah	
1169	1171	Saladin	Nephew and successor of Shirkuh, he deposed the Fatimid Caliphate and founded his own Ayyubid dynasty instead.	al-Adid li-Din Allah	

== Sources ==
- al-Imad, Leila S. (1990). The Fatimid Vizierate (979-1172). Berlin: Klaus Schwarz Verlag. ISBN 3-922968-82-1.
- Bianquis, Th. (2002). "Wazīr. I. In the Arab World 2. The Fāṭimid caliphate". In Bearman, P. J.; Bianquis, Th.; Bosworth, C. E.; van Donzel, E. & Heinrichs, W. P. (eds.). The Encyclopaedia of Islam, Second Edition. Volume XI: W–Z. Leiden: E. J. Brill. pp. 188–190. doi:10.1163/1573-3912_islam_COM_1346. ISBN 978-90-04-12756-2.
- Brett, Michael (2017). The Fatimid Empire. The Edinburgh History of the Islamic Empires. Edinburgh: Edinburgh University Press. ISBN 978-0-7486-4076-8.
- Canard, Marius (1965). "Ḍirg̲h̲ām". In Lewis, B.; Pellat, Ch. & Schacht, J. (eds.). The Encyclopaedia of Islam, Second Edition. Volume II: C–G. Leiden: E. J. Brill. pp. 317–319. doi:10.1163/1573-3912_islam_SIM_1874. OCLC 495469475.
- Canard, Marius (1965). "Fāṭimids". In Lewis, B.; Pellat, Ch. & Schacht, J. (eds.). The Encyclopaedia of Islam, Second Edition. Volume II: C–G. Leiden: E. J. Brill. pp. 850–862. doi:10.1163/1573-3912_islam_COM_0218. OCLC 495469475.
- Daftary, Farhad (2007). The Ismāʿı̄lı̄s: Their History and Doctrines (Second ed.). Cambridge: Cambridge University Press. ISBN 978-0-521-61636-2.
- Halm, Heinz (2003). Die Kalifen von Kairo: Die Fatimiden in Ägypten, 973–1074 [The Caliphs of Cairo: The Fatimids in Egypt, 973–1074] (in German). Munich: C. H. Beck. ISBN 3-406-48654-1.
- Halm, Heinz (2014). Kalifen und Assassinen: Ägypten und der vordere Orient zur Zeit der ersten Kreuzzüge, 1074–1171 [Caliphs and Assassins: Egypt and the Near East at the Time of the First Crusades, 1074–1171] (in German). Munich: C. H. Beck. doi:10.17104/9783406661648-1. ISBN 978-3-406-66163-1.
- Saleh, Abdel Hamid (2002). "Ibn Ḵh̲alaf". In Bearman, P. J.; Bianquis, Th.; Bosworth, C. E.; van Donzel, E. & Heinrichs, W. P. (eds.). The Encyclopaedia of Islam, Second Edition. Volume XI: W–Z. Leiden: E. J. Brill. p. 390. doi:10.1163/1573-3912_islam_SIM_8656. ISBN 978-90-04-12756-2.
- Sayyid, Ayman F. (1995). "Ṣāḥib al-Bāb". In Bosworth, C. E.; van Donzel, E.; Heinrichs, W. P. & Lecomte, G. (eds.). The Encyclopaedia of Islam, Second Edition. Volume VIII: Ned–Sam. Leiden: E. J. Brill. pp. 831–832. doi:10.1163/1573-3912_islam_SIM_6466. ISBN 978-90-04-09834-3.
- Sayyid, Ayman Fuʾād (1998). La capitale de l'Égypte jusqu'à l'époque fatimide. Al-Qāhira et al-Fusṭāṭ: Essai de reconstitution topographique. Beiruter Texte und Studien (in French). Stuttgart: Franz Steiner Verlag. ISBN 3-515-05716-1.
- Walker, Paul E. (2018). "Was the Fatimid Amīr al-Juyūsh in fact a Wazīr?". In Daftary, Farhad; Jiwa, Shainool (eds.). The Fatimid Caliphate: Diversity of Traditions. London and New York: I.B. Tauris, in association with the Institute of Ismaili Studies. pp. 80–93. ISBN 978-1-78831-133-5.
