= Alavi Bohras =

Muslim community from Gujarat, India

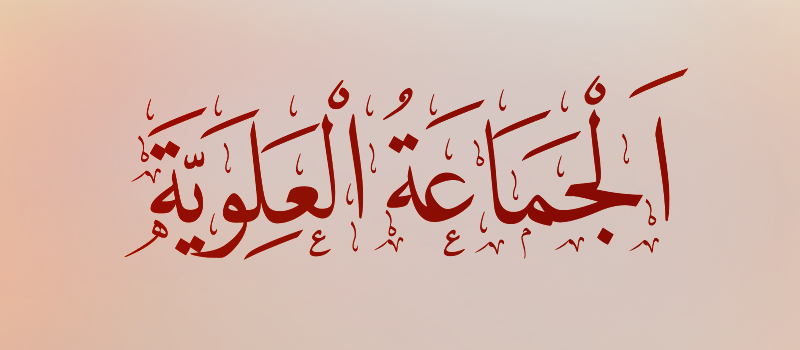

Regions with significant populations
- India

Languages
- Gujarati, Classical Arabic (liturgical), English (Indian dialect), Urdu

Religion
- Tayyibi Isma'ilism

Related ethnic groups
- Yemeni Sulaymani, other Bohras, Gujarati Muslims

The Alavi Bohras are a Tayyibi Musta'li Isma'ili Shi'i Muslim community from Gujarat, India. In India, during the time of the 18th Fatimid Imam Al-Mustansir Billah around 1093 AD in Egypt, the designated learned people (wulaat) who were sent from Yemen by missionaries (du'aat) under the guidance of the imam established a da'wah in Khambhat (Gujarat, India).

After the division of the Musta'lid community, the Yemenite Da'wah followed their 21st imam, the son of 20th Imam Al-Amir bi-Ahkam Allah in the succession of Fatimid Imams of Egypt, At-Tayyib Abu'l-Qasim as their Imam of seclusion, and the Bohras are the modern descendants of Tayyibi Da'wah established from Khambhat, Patan and Sidhpur in the 5th century Hijri and also the immigrants from Yemeni Tayyibi Da'wah.

Subsequently, splits occurred at various instances in the mainstream Bohra community regarding the spiritual appointment in the succession of the representative of the Imam us Satr or Da’i in Ahmedabad between 1422 and 1640 AD. Two major splits during this period resulted in the formation of three major groups of Bohras: Alavis, Dawoodis and Sulaymanis.

== History ==
After the death of the legatee of the Islamic prophet Muhammad, Ali in 40 AH, his son Hasan became the first Imam and this institution of Imamat i.e. succession of al-A'immat al-Faatemiyeen-الائمۃ الفاطمیین continued from father to son till the 21st Imam. This 21st Fatimid Imam At-Tayyib Abu'l-Qasim went into seclusion from Egypt in 528 AH, in Yemen under the guidance of Al-Hurrah Al-Malikah Arwa bint Ahmad from 532 AH, one da'i succeeded another through the tradition of nass: the exclusive spiritual appointment, until the 23rd Da'i i.e. from 1st Da'i Zoeb bin Saiyedi Moosa till 23rd Da'i Mohammad Izzuddin. In Sindh and India too Wali-ul-Hind ولي الھند were appointed by these Du'aat دعاۃ one after another until Wali-ul-Hind Ja'far, Abd ul Wahab and Qasim Khan bin Hasan (11th and last Wali-ul-Hind, d.950AH, Ahmedabad). The last three wali were of great help in the era of the 21st to 24th Da'i i.e. Husamuddin (921–932 AH), Shamsuddin (933 AH), Izzuddin (933–946 AH) and Najmuddin (946–974 AH). It was during this time when the seat of Da'wat e Haadiyah was transferred to India from Yemen, that the 23rd Da'i ul-Mutlaq الداعي المطلق Muhammad Izz al-Din I performed Nass (transfer of authority) on Yusuf Najmuddin I in Sidhpur, Gujarat, India.

Due to constant harassment and persecution by the local Zaydi Shi'a ruler in Yemen, the 24th Da'i, Yusuf Najmuddin I (d.1567 AD), shifted the whole administration of the Da'wat Haadiyah (rightly guided mission) to India but continued to live in Yemen in the last years of his tenure and died there in Taibah. See Al-Mutahhar for further information. The 25th Da'i Jalal Shamshuddin bin Hasan (d.1567 AD) was first Da'i to die in India and he was torch-bearer in establishing the representation (نیابۃ) of the Imam of the Time (امام الزمان) from the progeny of Muhammad though he stayed for only 4 months on the Seat of Da'wat (عرش الدعوۃ); his mausoleum is in Ahmedabad, India. As mentioned his tenure as a Da'i al-Mutlaq was very short but he played a pivotal role as one of the most trusted person from Hudood and as a Mazoon during the period of 23rd and 24th Da'i.

Following the death of the 26th Da'i Dawoodji Burhanuddin bin Saiyedi Ajabshah in 997AH/1591AD in Ahmedabad, there was a dispute as to who was to succeed him. Sulayman bin Hassan, the grandson of 24th Da'i Yusuf Najmuddin I, was wali in Yemen and claimed the succession, supported by the other Yemeni Bohra. However, the Indian Bohra denied his claim of nass, declaring supporting documentation to be forged. The two factions separated, with the followers of Sulayman becoming the Sulaymanis, and the followers of 27th Da'i Dawoodji Burhanuddin bin Qutubshah becoming the Dawoodi Bohra.

After the death of the 28th Da'i, Sheikh Adam Safiuddin, in 1030 AH/1621 AD, a small faction of Alavi Bohra in Ahmedabad recognized his grandson Ali bin Ibrahim (1046 AH/ 1637 AD) who was Mazoon, Mansoos and treasurer of Kutub e Da'wat, as his successor and got separated in 1030 AH from the majority Dawoodi Bohra who believed in Abduttayyeb Zakiuddin I, and Alavi Bohras followed a separate line of Du'aat residing mainly in Vadodara (Gujarat, India) where they have their own locality. Ali was supported by his uncle and secured very few followers. Ali never carried his protest to the court of Mughal Emperor Jahangir to declare him as a legitimate Da'i. Unverified accounts of this episode could be found in many publications. But Ali ordered his associate Hasan Badruddin in 1031 AH/1622 AD to go to the Mughal court in Lahore to meet Jahangir to complain on his behalf about the atrocities meted upon Alavis in Ahmedabad by their opponents. The help came and the lives of Alavis became better than before. This relief was short-lived and again the harassment sprung up more fiercely. Hasan Badruddin went again to Lahore for the same reason and then traveled to Kashmir to meet Emperor Shah Jahan in 1046 AH/1637 AD, the year of Ali's death. Hasan Badruddin was not present at the time of the burial of Ali.

Ali, the 29th Alavi Da'i was born in the walled city of Vadodara in Fakhri Mohalla, when 27th Da'i Dawoodji bin Saiyedi Qutubshah was alive in Ahmedabad. His father Ibrahim died during his childhood. He was Hafiz ul-Qur'an in a tender age and when his grandfather 28th Da'i Sheikh Adam Safiuddin brought him to Ahmedabad for further studies in Uloom-e-Da'wat in the Majlis of 27th Da'i, by seeing face of Ali, 27th Da'i gave glad-tidings بشارۃ to 28th Da'i that, "This son will become the Light of your Eyes, so educate him as he is going to become the man of great acclaim"

Holding that the era of Muhammad had come to an end, a group of Alavi Bohras seceded in 1178 AH/1764 AD during the da'iship of 36th Da'i Shamsuddin Hameeduddin in Vadodara. Because of their abstention from eating meat they were called Nagoshias (non meat eaters). They followed their separate line of leaders for the next 100 years. In 1310 AH/1892 AD, 41st Alavi Da'i Jivabhai Fakhruddin summoned their elders and after explaining them the realities of Shari'at he respectfully accepted them and took them into the fold of Alavi Bohras.

== Meaning and origin of Bohras ==
In India, during the time of the 18th Fatimid Imam, Al-Mustansir Billah around 486 AH/1093 AD, the designated learned people (wulaat - ولاۃ) who were sent from Yemen by the celebrated missionaries (du'aat ul-balaagh – دعاۃ البلاغ) under the guidance of the manifest Imam (as opposed to the imam of the time of seclusion) established the foundation of Isma'ili-Tayyibi Da'wat in the region of Gujarat (Cambay or Khambhat). It was the result of their perseverance and efforts that people started believing and accepting the Isma'ili-Tayyibi principles and gradually the mission of Yemen gave birth to a new community in India – The Bohras. The succession of those designated learned people who worked as deputies of the missionaries of Yemen came to be known as Wulaat ul-Hind in India. They were all in close contact with the spiritual authority of Yemen i.e. the Da'i al-Mutlaq after the seclusion of the 21st Imam, At-Tayyib Abu'l-Qasim from Egypt.

In Ahmedabad between 825 and 1050 AH/1422-1640 AD the mainstream Bohra community got divided into 3 major groups. Among them, Alavi Bohras, who are mainly traders and merchants, are patriotic, peace-loving and harmonious people. The word ‘Bohra-بھرۃ or Vohra or Vohorwu or Vyavahar' itself indicates maintaining healthy relations and is derived from the Gujarati word ‘vohorvu’ or ‘vyavahar’, which means "to trade". Secondly its name reflects the characteristic of "al-Jamaa'at ul-Baaherah – الجماعۃ الباھرۃ" meaning the extraordinary brilliant community with full of life and love. Their cultural and social upbringing is such that the values of peace and prosperity are in their blood and they do not believe in social discord or religious conflicts. Some of the groups or clans of Sunnis in Gujarat who also are traders and do not belong to the mainstream Bohras have adopted the name of Vohra or Vora, owing to the fame and respect of the "Bohra" name. But they do not follow the basic doctrines and customs of the Isma'ili-Tayyibi Bohras. The early Indian converts of the 11th century AD during the reign of 18th Fatimid Imam Al-Mustansir Billah consisted of a single group of Isma'ili Bohras owing allegiance to the missionaries (du'aat ul-balaagh) who conveyed spiritual orders of manifest Imam (imaam-e-zaahir) to common believers in Yemen and India.

== Certain Isma'ili Tayyibi terminology ==
=== Spiritual mission ===
- دعوۃ – Da’wat is a call, mission, invitation or summons related to divinity or spirituality towards the unity and oneness of Allah. The mission is of Truth and the truth could never be separated from the Almighty (al-Qur'an ch.13 v.14). It existed before this material world and will be there after its annihilation. It is the Mission of Truth, the Bridge towards Salvation, an Arc of Guidance, the Light showing the Point of Return, the Way to Heavens, the Proof of Imamat-امامۃ and an institution to attain ranks as per the deeds. It also refers to the hierarchy of ranks (hudood-حدود) within the rightly guided religious organization called ad-Da’wat ul-Haadiyah-الدعوۃ الھادیۃ. The one who calls is called Da’i-داعي or Haadi-ھادي (missionary or guide) who is divinely appointed by his predecessor. Everyone who heads Da’wat right from the first prophet Adam until Muhammad, his progeny and their deputies are called Da’i with the same aim, guidance and directives. Da’wat is for Unity and Peace. Outwardly it is in the form of Islam and inwardly it is Imaan-ایمان (faith). Today, 45th Da’i al-Mutlaq Saiyedna saheb is the deputy of the Da’wat of Imaam uz Zamaan-امام الزمان, the hidden imaam from the lineage of 21st Imam Abul Qasim At-Tayyib.

The Da'wat is organized hierarchically, in line with the particular importance accorded to hierarchism and step by step designation in Fatimid Isma'ili thought carried forward in its Tayyibi branch in Yemen and India called as Tayyibi Isma'ilism, continuing down to the present time. Indeed, there is a close analogy between the terrestrial hierarchy of the Fatimid Da'wat organization with its highest ranks of Naatiq (Nabi, prophet), Asaas (Wasi, vicegerent) and Imam, and the celestial or cosmological hierarchy developed during the period of the Fatimid Caliphate and strictly followed by the missionaries in India today.

=== Designating a person on a spiritual rank ===
- نص – Nass: It is an explicit, clear and specific declaration and designation through Divine Indication and Spiritual Intervention-تأئید إلھي for the appointment of a successor-منصوص, be it an Imam or his deputy-داعي during Imam's concealment by his predecessor-ناص amongst his subjects, publicly-نص جلي or privately نص خفي and at times supported by written documentary orders-سجل شریف. This tradition and practice-سنۃ اللہ is related to the Isma’ili Taiyebi succession to the seat of Imaamat, whereby each Imam under hidden heavenly commands designates his successor, when he witnesses the Light of Imaamat-نور الإمامۃ has got transferred to one of his sons whom he selects for Nass. During the seclusion of Imam, his deputy-Da’i performs this act of succession whom he finds eligible for the status of Da’i. He might not be from his sons, unlike the succession of Imam where an Imam always appoints his successor from one of his sons. The succession of Imaamat has begun from the Adam Safiyullaah-آدم صفي اللہ and will continue till the last day when Qaa’im ul Qeyaamah-قائم القیامۃ will act as the final authority on the Day of Judgement.

=== Da'i al-Mutlaq ===
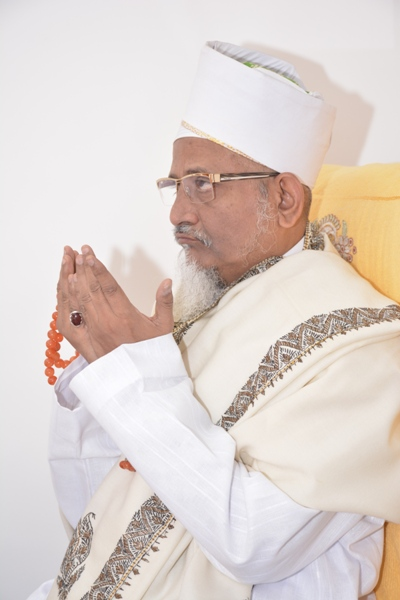
The 45th Da'i al-Mutlaq, Haatim Zakiyuddin

- الداعي المطلق، داعي المطلق – ad-Da'i ul-Mutlaq or Da'i al-Mutlaq: It is the spiritual rank in Isma'ili Tayyibi Da'wah which became more explicit and operational after the seclusion of 21st Fatimid Imam of Cairo, At-Tayyib Abu'l-Qasim in 528 AH/1134 AD. After Muhammad this rank is on the 6th position and after this comes Mazoon-مأذون and Mukaasir-مکاسر. Before the seclusion, the Da’i or a missionary used to work under the direct orders of an Imam and his trusted associates in all the 12 islands-جزائر where faithful were present and living either openly propounding their faith or secretly due to the fear of their lives. In Yemen, after the seclusion of an Imam, Da’i was given Itlaaq-إطلاق or a free conduct and absolute religious and social authority but under the governing principles of Isma'ili Tayyibi Faith. His command is now regarded as a final decree guided by the divine support-الهام of Imam and this is the reason he is called Da'i al-Mutlaq. After the death of 20th Fatimid Imam Al-Amir bi-Ahkam Allah (d. 526 AH/1132 AD), his hujjat in Yemen al-Hurrah al-Malekah (d. 532 AH/1138 AD) appointed the first Da'i al-Mutlaq Zo'eb bin Moosa al-Waade’i. From this time onwards 532 AH/1138 AD the headquarters of Tayyibi Isma'ilism was established in Yemen where the development of Tayyibi Da'wah came under the powerful leadership of Da'i al-Mutlaq. The Musta'lavi Tayyibi Da'is of Yemen and their aides were accredited and responsible for maintaining the high standards of the Fatimid literary tradition. Da'i is considered "like infallible"-كالمعصوم as he is not self-proclaimed head of the community but he is only acting as a legatee to Imam. He is not an Imam but enjoying all powers that an Imam holds under the capacity of Imamat.

Unlike the case of Imam, where he appoints his successor only from his sons through divinely guided practice called Nass-نص, the Da’i can appoint anyone in his place who is most trusted, pious and capable of carrying responsibility of Da’wah affairs with wisdom and proficiency. Once a Da'i propagates Nass to a person or appoints his successor it could not be reverted. Haatim Zakiyuddin is the 45th Da’i al-Mutlaq of Alavi Bohras in the line of succession of these Da’is in which 24 are in Yemen, 7 are in Ahmedabad, 1 is in Surat and 12 are in Vadodara. Followers call him with honorific title of "Saiyedna saheb", "Aqaa Maulaa" or "Bawa saheb".

=== Mazoon al-Mutlaq ===
- المأذون المطلق – al-Mazoon al-Mutlaq, Mazoon e Mutlaq: The Licentiate, Authoritative Rank, the most trusted associate in Da’wah ranks who takes Bayat -Pledge of Loyalty from his subjects by the orders of Da’i al-Mutlaq. He is on a Spiritual Rank in the Isma’ili Tayyibi Da’wah hierarchy immediately below the authority of Da’i who sits in his right side and who carries out the religious activities as per the regulations of Da’wah organization. At any cost he always assists and obeys his superior and his Master, the Da’i al-Mutlaq. His prime responsibility is to conduct teaching sessions and make them understand the basic things of Isma’ili Tayyibi faith. In the absence of Da’i he acts as his legatee. Da’i may appoint his Mazoon as his successor. And if not Da’i can appoint someone more learned and efficient for the post of Da’i after him and can never disqualifies Mazoon from his post. As the respectable post of Mazoon is necessary for the completeness of Spiritual Hierarchy. As far as Alavi Da'wah is concerned, from the time of 28th Da'i in Ahmedabad till 45th Da'i in Vadodara, every Mazoon has become Mansoos (successor) of a former Da'i. There exist not a single instance where Mazoon and Mansoos are separate entities. Da'i after examining minutely appoints his Mazoon only when he finds him eligible to be his successor. On the death of Mazoon, Da'i immediately appoints another trusted person on this rank.

=== Mukaasir al-Mutlaq ===
- المکاسر المطلق – al-Mukaasir al-Mutlaq, Mukaasir e Mutlaq – The Eight and the last rank in the Spiritual Hierarchy of the Isma’ili Tayyibism. He sits left to the Da’i al-Mutlaq during the religious gathering-Majlis. He is lower to the rank of Mazoon. He is well versed and well informed about the baseless beliefs of other sects for which he thinks as a threat to the faith of believers. His responsibility is to train the beginner – مستجیب مؤمن and win over the neophyte who is little aware of the overall understanding of Islamic Faith and by proper grooming he enters him into the fold of Isma’ilism by taking Oath of Fealty in the name of the present Da’i al-Mutlaq. He is quite expert in putting Rational and Logical arguments with necessary ideological and doctrinal proofs and healthy debates. On the death of Mukaasir, Da'i entrusts this rank to one of his close associates. In some cases, on the death of Mazoon, Da'i elevates Mukaasir to the rank of Mazoon.

=== A Beginner in Isma'ili Tayyibi Faith ===
- مؤمن مستجیب – Mu'min Mustajeeb – A Believer or a Beginner in Isma'ili Tayyibi Faith who pure-heartedly, respectfully, devotionally and uncondionally accepts the guidance from Mukaasir e Mutlaq and gives Oath of Obedience to all the Eight Spiritual Ranks viz. from Mukaasir to Nabi (prophet). After giving oath he initiates his long journey of learning, piety and salvation. With every passing day he only learns and acquires the articles of faith which his Superiors think beneficial for him. As he is a beginner, as per Isma'ili Faith, he cannot doubt or question a little bit on any command of his Masters (صاحب مقام).

=== Salaam and Qadam-bosi ===
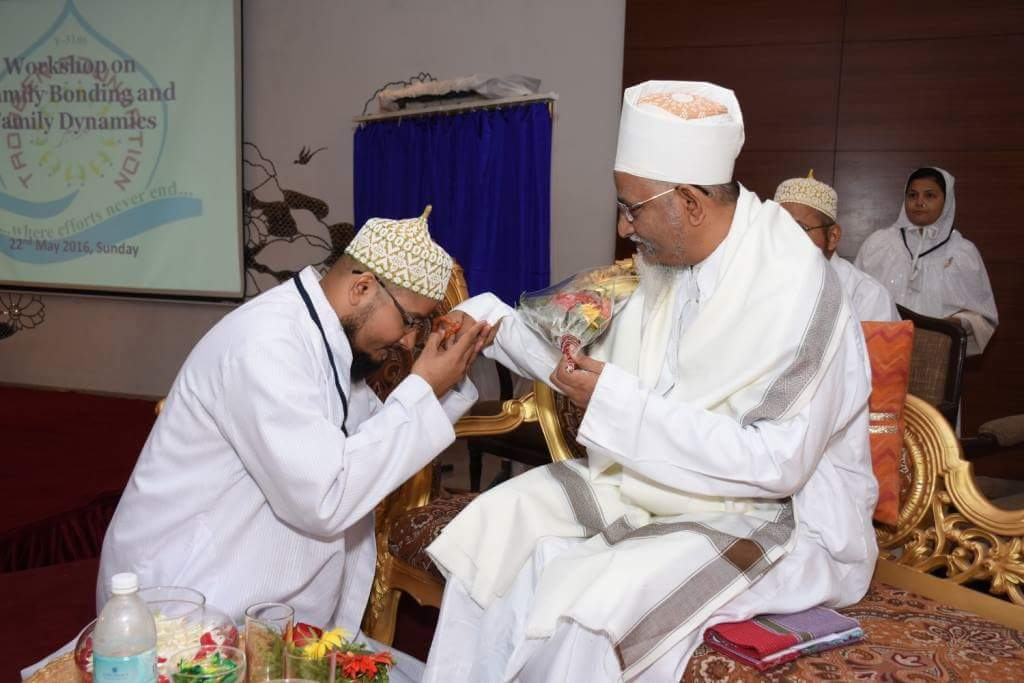
Paying respect by offering Salaam and performing Qadam-bosi to Saiyedna saheb

- سلام – Salaam – Salutation, Safety, Greeting, Peace or Respect of a person with Spiritual status or a general believer of Da'wat ul-Haqq (mission of truth). It is one of the beautiful attributes of Allah the Almighty. This term is used 19 times in the Qur'an and it is equal to the letters if "Bismillaah ir Rahman ir Raheem", the beginning of the Qur'an and the most recited verse in the Islamic World. The completion of any supplication (du'aa-دعاء) is endorsed with the Salaam (salawaat-صلوات) on the Prophets and their households. It also refers to the prescribed Islamic voluntary or compulsory monetary payments done by a believer throughout the year to the Da'i (missionary). It is the basic element of Islamic etiquette and ethics. It is regarded as good practice to start any talk with "as-salaamo 'alaykum"-السلام علیکم (peace be upon you). The greeting of the people of Paradise-اھل الجنۃ is Salaam. The faith of Islam is nothing but Salaam. The core of Islam is to remain in Peace and to make others feel Peace. A believer must do salaam & qadam-bosi-قدم بوسي (to kiss right knee of an Imam) after every prayer (namaaz). Salaam is that a believer bows down in front of an Imam then holds his right hand while keeping his right eye first then left eye then forehead and at the end kisses his hand. This he does 2 times. Then at the end kisses his right knee and does request for Du'aa and blessings. This refers to the Prophetic tradition that, "Paradise is underneath the Feet of Mothers," Mothers here means the Imam or his representative (da'i) from the progeny of Muhammad.
  The Heart of the Qur'an is its Chapter Yaa Seen (36). The heart of this chapter is its verse "Peace is the word from a Merciful Lord" (58). The heart of this verse is Salaam. So truly speaking the essence of Qur'an is Peace. The first sign of hypocrisy and enmity is to stop offering Salaam.
  Prophetic Traditions: 1. Offering the peace-greeting and speaking with kindness will assuredly win God's mercy. 2. Call out the peace greeting and you will know peace. 3. Show concern for your relatives, even with a greeting. 4. The greeting of our people is "Peace", our subject's security. 5. Greet before conversing.
  41st Indian missionary Saiyedna Jivabhai Fakhruddin (d. 1347 AH/1929 AD) says in his poetic verses, "Khuda ne kaha jinko har dam Salaam, Kalaam unka hai goya Haqq ka Kalaam", God has offered Salaam to the ones whose dialogue and words are the words of Truth (God).
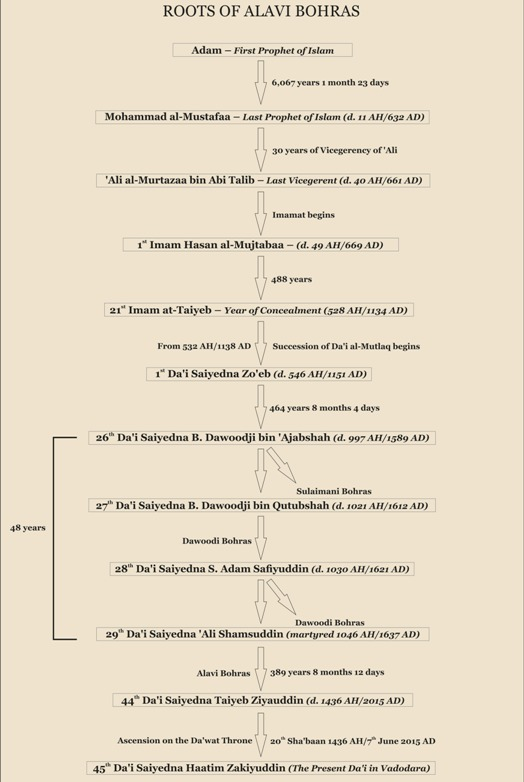
  7486 years of Spiritual Tree of Alavi Bohras

=== Shajarah ===
- شجرۃ - Shajarah - Tree. Tree means the spiritual hierarchy within the Tayyibi Da'wat. It starts from the first prophet of Islam Maulaana Adam who conveyed the core message of the oneness of Allah till the Last prophet of Islam Muhammad al-Mustafa who is the Seal of Prophethood. After him his progeny became the guardian of Islam and this will continue till the Last day of Judgement. This holy tree will never die and it will provide the cool shadow of peace and progress to the travellers in this world in the form Du'aat-missionaries.

In Qur'anic verses the Holy Tree-شجرۃ طیبۃ is referred to the Light of Allah which means keeping faith in Aal e Muhammad and their Da'i and this faith gives Noor to the heart of the faithful (ch. 24 v. 35). This Holy Tree is also related to the Good Utterance-کلمۃ طیبۃ i.e. the Imam from the Pure Progeny-ذریۃ طیبۃ of prophet Muhammad who will remain all the time for the guidance of humanity. The roots of this holy tree is very strong and spread across the land and its branches have gone high in the heavens (ch. 14 v. 24).

Muhammad says in one of his Hadees: "I am in this world like a traveler who takes a nap in the shade of a tree on a hot day, then continues on his way." Here, the shade of tree is Nubuwat (prophethood) and the hot day is the world of ignorance. After getting divine attachment one can proceed in his travel and hope for the better Hereafter-آخرۃ

Saiyedna Hasan bin Nooh Bharuchi in one of his works brings vivid description of this Holy Tree: "Muhammad al-Mustafa is the base (root), 'Ali Ameer ul-Mumineen is its trunk, Faatimah az-Zahraa is its branches, Imam Hasan and Imam Husain are its fruits and flowers and Shi'a is its leaves. It has been grown in the Paradise, the like of which one can never find on this earth."

== List of missionaries ==
=== Yemen - يمن ===
During the time of 18th Fatimid Imam Al-Mustansir Billah and his son, 19th Fatimid Imam Al-Musta'li, four important personalities strengthened the foundation of Fatimid Da’wat in Yemen. They were Saiyedna ‘Ali bin Muhammad as-Sulayhi, Saiyedna Ahmad al-Mukarram, Saiyedatona Hurrat ul-Malekah Arwaa binte Ahmad and Saiyedna Lamak bin Maalik. They injected new life in the Walaayat of Imaam uz-Zamaan and guided the faithful to the Path of Truth and Justice. Faithfuls were in peace and harmony under their leadership.

After the demise of Maulaana Imam Musta'li, his son, 20th Fatimid Imam Al-Amir bi-Ahkam Allah, ascended to the throne of Imamat on 17th Safar 495 AH/1101 AD. His period of Imamat is 31 yrs. He was martyred by his enemies in Cairo on the night of 4th Zul Qa’dah 526 AH/1132 AD and died on the same night. Maulaatona Hurrat ul-Malekah, who was in Yemen during all these hard times, was preparing to establish firmly the institution of Fatimid Tayyibi Da'wat in Yemen in the name of the 21st Fatimid Imam At-Tayyib Abu'l-Qasim who was born to 20th Imam Aamir on 4 Rabi' al-Aakhar 524 AH/1130 AD in Cairo. She acted as Hujjat-proof of Imam during this period. She came to know the fate of Fatimid Caliphate through the signs sent to her by 20th Imaam. Saiyedna Lamak bin Maalik and Saiyedna Yahya bin Lamak learned the knowledge of Da’wat from Maulaatona Hurrat ul-Malekah that helped her by all means in the administration of Da’wat. This was a crucial time when there was an imminent fall of Caliphate in Cairo and simultaneous reinforcement and establishment of Fatimid Da’wat in Yemen.

There were numerous Hudood who were seeking the knowledge of Da’wat by the permission of Maulaatona Hurrat ul-Malekah from Saiyedna Lamak bin Maalik and Saiyedna Yahya bin Lamak. Out of all Hudood, Saiyedna Zo’eb bin Moosa and Saiyedna as-Sultan al-Khattaab were outstanding in grasping the teachings and intricacies of the Fatimid Da’wat. They both clearly stood out of the group in their smartness and intelligence. With the permission of Maulaatona Hurrat ul-Malekah, they were ascended to the higher ranks of the Hudood and were given privilege to acquire the complete knowledge of Da’wat. These two personalities, in future, were to become pivotal forces in the beginning of the succession of Du’aat ul-Akrameen-missionaries in Yemen. Maulaatona Hurrat ul-Malekah now had two more loyal Hudood to support her. No one knew, but this was Hikmat (wisdom) of Allah that within a span of 10 years Saiyedna Lamak bin Maalik and Saiyedna Yahya bin Lamak died in Yemen, In their absence, Saiyedna Zo’eb bin Moosa and Saiyedna as-Sultaan al-Khattaab served Da’wat with full devotion in such a way that Maulaatona Hurrat ul-Malekah never felt void of anyone.

Before her death on 22nd Sha'baan 532 AH/1138 AD, she appointed Saiyedna Zo'eb as the First Da'i al-Mutlaq داعي المطلق of three 3 jazaa'ir Hind, Sindh and Yemen. Thus one after the other this succession of Du'aat al-Mutlaqeen دعاۃ المطلقین continued in Yemen until the death of 24th Da'i Saiyedna Yusuf Najmuddin I on 16th Zul Hijjah 974 AH/1567 AD.

No.	Name of the Da'i (Saiyedna – سیدنا)	Death – تأریخ الإنتقال	Place of the Tomb – قبر مبارک	Period of Da'wat – مدۃ الدعوۃ	Licentiate – مأذون	Associate – مکاسر	Works – تألیفات
1	Zo'eb bin Moosa Al Waadei	10 Moharram 546 AH – 28/4/1151 AD	Haws Mubaarak	13 yrs 4 mts 18 days	as-Sultaan al-Khattaab bin Hasan, Ibraahim bin Husain al-Haamedi	'Ali bin Husain	Risaalat un-Nafs fi Ma'refat il-Jussah – رسالۃ النفس فی معرفۃ الجثۃ
2	Ibraahim bin Husain Al Hamidi	16 Sha’baan 557 AH – 30/7/1162 AD	Ghail-e-Bani Haamid, Hamdaan	11 yrs 7 mts 6 days	'Ali bin Husain bin Ahmad bin al-Waleed, Haatim bin Ibraahim al-Haamedi	Mohammad bin Taaher	Kanz ul-Walad – کنز الولد
3	Hatim ibn Ibrahim Al Hamidi	16 Moharram 596 AH – 6/11/1199 AD	Hutayb Mubaarak	38 yrs 5 mts	Mohammad bin Taaher al-Haaresi, 'Ali bin Mohammad al-Waleed		Tanbeeh ul-Ghaafeleen – تنبیہ الغافلین
4	Ali ibn Hatim Al Hamidi	25 Zul Qa’adah 605 AH – 30/5/1209 AD	Sana’a	9 yrs 10 mts 10 days	'Ali bin Mohammad al-Waleed		
5	Ali bin Muhammad Al Walid	27 Sha’baan 612 AH – 20/12/1215 AD	Hiraaz	6 yrs 9 mts 3 days	'Ali bin Hanzalah	Ahmad bin Mubaarak	Taaj ul-Aqaa'id wa Ma'dan ul-Fawaa'id – تاج العقائد و معدن الفوائد
6	Ali ibn Hanzala Al Waadei	12 Rabi’ I 626 AH – 7/2/1229 AD	Hamadaan	13 yrs 6 mts 15 days	Ahmad bin Mubaarak	Husain bin ‘Ali	Simt ul-Haqaa'iq – سمط الحقائق
7	Ahmad ibn Mubarak Al Waadei	28 Jumaadi II 627 AH – 12/5/1230 AD	Hamadaan	1 yr 3 mts 16 days	Husain bin 'Ali	al-Qaazi Ahmad bin 'Ali bin Hanzalah	
8	Husain bin Ali Al Walid	22 Safar 667 AH – 30/10/1268 AD	Hiql, Sana’a	39 yrs 7 mts 24 days	al-Qaazi Ahmad bin 'Ali bin Hanzalah, 'Ali bin Husain	Mohammad bin Asad	Kitaab ul-Izaahe wal Bayaan fil Jawaab 'an Masaa'il il-Imtihaan – کتاب الإیضاح و البیان فی جواب عن مسائل الإمتحان
9	Ali bin Husain Al Walid	13 Zul Qa’adah 682 AH – 1/2/1284 AD	Sana’a	15 yrs 8 mts 21 days	Husain bin 'Ali, 'Ali bin Husain bin 'Ali bin Hanzalah	As'ad bin Haatim	ar-Risaalat ul-Kaamelah fi Salaas il-Layaali il-Faazalah – الرسالۃ الکاملۃ فی ثلاث اللیالي الفاضلۃ
10	Ali bin Husain bin Ali Al Waadei	1 Safar 686 AH – 17/3/1287 AD	Sana’a	3 yrs 2 mts 17 days	Ibraahim bin Husain		
11.	Ibrahim bin Husain Al Walid	10 Shawwaal 728 AH – 16/8/1328 AD	Hisn-e-Af'edah	42 yrs 8 mts 9 days	Mohammad bin Haatim		
12.	Muhammad ibn Hatim Al Walid	1 Zul Hijjah 729 AH – 25/9/1329 AD	Hisn-e-Af'edah	1 yr 1 mt 7 days	'Ali bin Ibraahim		
13.	Ali Shamsuddeen bin Ibraahim	18 Rajab 746 AH – 13/11/1345 AD	Hisn-e-Zimarmar	16 yrs 7 mts 18 days	'Abd ul-Muttalib bin Mohammad		
14.	Abd ul-Muttalib Najmuddeen bin Mohammad	14 Rajab 755 AH – 3/8/1354 AD	Hisn-e-Zimarmar	8 yrs 11 mts 25 days	'Abbaas bin Mohammad		
15.	Abbas ibn Muhammad	8 Shawwaal 779 AH – 6/2/1378 AD	Hisn-e-Af'edah	24 yrs 2 mts 24 days	'Abdullaah bin 'Ali		
16.	Abdullah Fakhruddeen bin Ali	9 Ramazaan 809 AH – 16/2/1407 AD	Hisn-e-Zimarmar	29 yrs 11 mts 1 day	'Ali bin 'Abdullaah ash-Shaybaani, Hasan bin 'Abdullaah	'Abd ul-Muttalib bin 'Abdullaah	al-Muneerah fi Ma'refat il-Hudood il-Jazeerah – المنیرۃ فی معرفۃ حدود الجزیرۃ
17.	Hasan Badruddeen bin Abdullah	6 Shawwaal 821 AH – 5/11/1418 AD	Hisn-e-Zimarmar	12 yrs 27 days	'Abd ul-Muttalib bin 'Abdullaah, Mohammad bin Idrees	Ahmad bin 'Abdullaah	
18.	Ali Shamsuddeen bin Abdullah	3 Safar 832 AH – 11/11/ 1428 AD	Shaareqah	10 yrs 3 mts 27 days	Idrees bin Hasan		
19.	Idrees Imaduddeen bin Hasan	19 Zul Qa’adah 872 AH – 9/6/1468 AD	Shibaam	40 yrs 9 mts 16 days	Ma'ad bin 'Abdullaah		'Uyoon ul-Akhbaar wa Funoon ul-Aasaar – عیون الاخبار و فنون الآثار
20.	Hasan Badruddeen bin Idrees Imaduddeen	15 Sha’baan 918 AH – 25/10/1512 AD	Masaar	45 yrs 8 mts 26 days	'Abdullaah Fakhruddeen bin 'Ali, Husain Husaamuddeen bin Idrees	'Ali bin Husain	
21.	Husain Husamuddeen bin Idrees Imaduddeen	10 Shawwaal 933 AH – 9/7/1527 AD	Masaar	15 yrs 1 mt 25 days	'Ali Shamsuddeen bin Husain	Mohammad 'Izzuddeen bin 'Ali	
22.	Ali Shamsuddeen bin Husain	21 Zul Qa’dah 933 AH – 18/8/ 1527 AD	Masaar	1 mt 10 days	Mohammad 'Izzuddeen bin 'Ali		
23.	Mohammed Izzuddeen	27 Safar 946 AH – 13/7/1539 AD	Zabeed	12 yrs 3 mts 6 days	Yoosuf Najmuddeen		
24.	Yoosuf Najmuddeen bin Sulaiman	16 Zul Hijjah 974 AH – 23/6/1567 AD	Taibah	28 yrs 9 mts 23 days	Jalaal Fakhruddeen bin Hasan		

=== Ahmedabad - احمدآباد ===
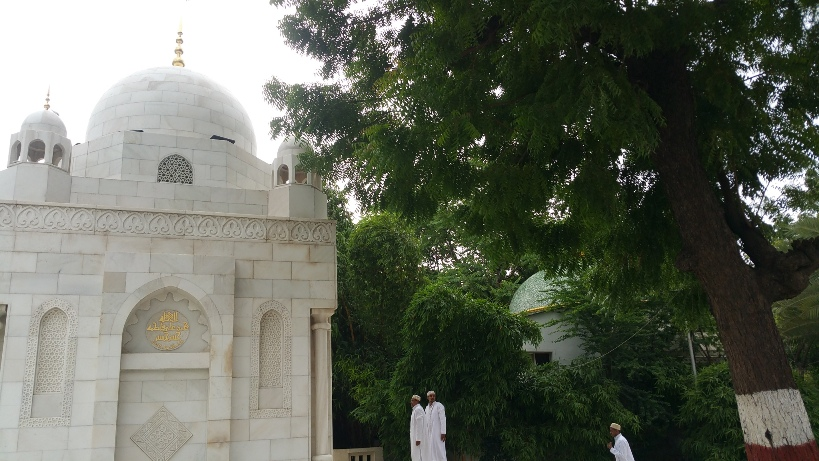
Saraspur, Ahmedabad is the only place where mausoleums of the missionaries-du'aat of 3 Bohra communities are located. This place is the converging point for all.

During the 11th century AD, when 18th Fatimid Imam Al-Mustansir Billah was in power in Cairo, the region of Khambhat, Patan and Siddhpur saw extensive activities of Isma’ili Da’wat and then after the concealment of the 21st Fatimid Imam At-Tayyib Abu'l-Qasim in 532 AH/1138 AD, the holy preachers and propagandists worked under the absolute guidance of their religious chief-da’i al-mutlaq who were serving as a representatives of their concealed Imam. These preachers served as the head of the Da'wat in Indian subcontinent, locally known as the wali or maulaai, were regularly selected by the da'i al-mutlaq residing in Yemen. It was during the da’iship of 17th Da’i Hasan Badruddin (809–821 AH/ 1406–1418 AD), the city of Ahmedabad was founded and Ahmad Shah I invited Adam Shujaa’uddin bin Sulaiman, Shaikha Mujaal and Khwaja Kalaan to convince the Bohra traders and rich merchants to start their trade from Ahmedabad and make it their home-town. Till the time of 19th Da'i Idris Imaduddin (832-872 AH/1428-1468 AD), due to the efforts of Adam Shujaa’uddin sizable Bohras migrated from Patan to Ahmedabad.

So this was the period of the first Bohra settlement in Ahmedabad as it proved to be a safe haven for the peace-loving community scattered in the other towns surrounding Ahmedabad. At that time sizable Bohra population could be found at Patan, Khambhat, Siddhpur, Nadiad, Kapadvanj, Bharuch, Vadodara, Umreth, Mehsana, Dholka etc. Bohras prospered in Ahmedabad but it was overshadowed with some brutal and gruesome attacks now and then by the Muslim Sultanate. The Bohras of Gujarat and their da'is were not persecuted by the local Hindu rulers, who did not feel endangered by their activities. The community thus developed without any hindrance until the Muslim conquest of Gujarat in 697 AH/1298 AD, when the Da'wat's activities came under the scrutiny of the region's Muslim governors, who recognized the suzerainty of the Sultans of Delhi, who belonged to the Khalji and Tughluqid dynasties. It was chiefly because of Ja’far Patani Naherwali and his people who left Isma’ili-Tayyibi faith and accepted Sunnism and they constantly instigated local Muslim rulers against the Bohras. During the time between 850 and 950 AH/1447-1544 AD many preachers-Maulaai were martyred or jailed. Ahmedabad became called "Nani Karbala" (small karbala) because of the large number of martyrs buried there and also "Baagh-e-Aal-e-Mohammad" (paradise of Ahl e Bayt). 28th da'i al-mutlaq Sheikh Adam Safiuddin (d. 1030 AH/1621 AD) held the key leadership and played pivotal role in managing the internal community matters and external political affairs in Ahmedabad during the time of various da'is, he studied with 24th da'i in Yemen and was authorized to propagate the mission-da'wat in the Deccan.

During the rule of Mughal Emperor Akbar & Jahangir, Bohra community witnessed 2 major splits in Ahmedabad. The Bohras got divided into three major groups viz. Alavis, Dawoodis and Sulaymanis in the span of nearly 40 years- 997–1030 AH/1589-1621 AD. This way Ahmedabad today enjoys the only converging place of all the three Bohra groups after the splits as their du’aat-missionaries are buried in the same graveyard located at Saraspur (Bibipur). Due to the constant persecution by the Muslim rulers, Bohras left Ahmedabad permanently and shifted their seat of Da’wat. Alavi Bohras migrated to Vadodara in 1110 AH/1699 AD during the da'iship of 32nd da'i acting on the will of his predecessor and they were the last among Bohras to leave Ahmedabad. Dawoodi Bohras migrated to Jamnagar in 1065 AH/1657 AD and Sulaimani Bohras had their centre in Yemen after the split. Among Bohras in Ahmedabad, today Alavi Bohras remain as a minority with small number of families stay there.

No.	Name of the Da'i (Saiyedna – سیدنا)	Death – تأریخ الإنتقال	Period of Da'wat – مدۃ الدعوۃ	Licentiate – مأذون	Associate – مکاسر	Works – تألیفات
25.	Jalal Fakhruddeen bin Hasan	16 Rabi' II 975 AH – 19/10/1567 AD	4 mts	Dawoodji Burhanuddeen bin Ajabshah	Dawoodji Burhanuddeen bin Qutubshah	
26.	Dawoodji Burhanuddeen bin Ajabsha	27 Rabi' II 999 AH – 21/2/1591 AD	24 yrs 11 days	Dawoodji Burhanuddeen bin Qutubshah	Shaikh Adam Safiyuddeen bin Taiyebshah	
27.	Dawoodji Burhanuddeen bin Qutubshah	15 Jumaadi II 1021 AH – 12/8/1612 AD	22 yrs 1 mt 18 days	al-Qaazi Ameenshah Shujaauddeen, Shaikh Adam Safiyuddeen bin Taiyebshah	Ameenjibin Jalaal	
28.	Shaikh Adam Safiyuddeen bin Taiyebshah	7 Rajab 1030 AH – 27/5/1621 AD	9 yrs 21days	Ali Mohammad bin Firoz, 'Ali bin Ibraahim	Ameenji bin Jalaal	
29.	Ali bin Ibrahim bin Sheikh Adam Safiyuddeen, the martyr	23 Zul Qa’adah 1046 AH – 17/4/1637 AD	16 yrs 4 mts 16 days	Taiyeb Zakiyuddeen bin Shaikh Adam Safiyuddeen	Ameenji bin Jalaal, Hasan Badruddeen bin Wali	Kitaab un-Naseehah fi Anwaar ish-Shari'ah – کتاب النصیحۃ فی انوار الشریعۃ
30.	Taiyeb Zakiyuddeen bin Sheikh Adam Safiyuddeen	13 Shawwaal 1047 AH – 26/2/1638 AD	10 mts 20 days	Hasan Badruddeen bin Wali	Jivabhai Ziyauddeen bin Noohji	
31	Hasan Badruddeen bin Wali	19 Rabi' II 1090 AH – 29/5/1679 AD	42 yrs 6 mts 6 days	Jivabhai Ziyauddeen bin Noohji	Hebatullaah Moaiyad Fiddeen bin Jivabhai Ziyauddeen	Diwaan-e-Hasan – دیوان حسن

=== Vadodara - ودودرة ===
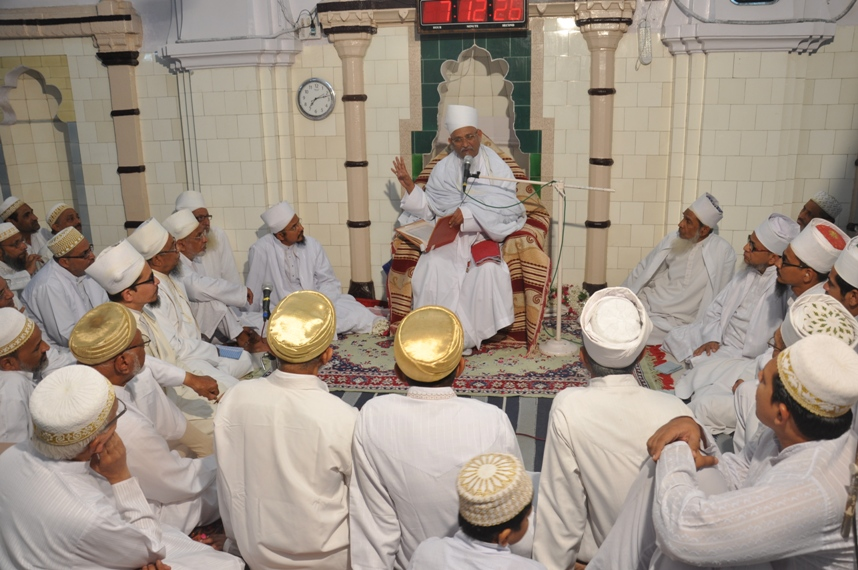
Aqaa Maulaa, the then Mazoon e Mutlaq visited Fakhri Masjid in Moharram 1436 AH/2014 AD on the death anniversary of Saiyedi Musanji bin Taaj saheb

The city of Vadodara deserves a special attention along with the Tayyibi missionary activities in Ahmedabad as many devoted personalities worked hard to retain the community faith when the turmoil of dissidents created by Ja’far Naherwali was at its peak. During the time of 21st Da’i al-Mutlaq Saiyedna saheb (tus) Hasan Badruddin bin Idris (d. 933 AH/1537 AD) when Mahmood Shah II was the sultan of Gujarat, Mulla Isma’il of Vadodara migrated to Ahmedabad and he was martyred along with his accomplices on the banks of Sabarmati River.

Vadodara is the birthplace of 28th, 29th and 30th Alavi Da'is who migrated and did Da’wat in Ahmedabad from 1021 to 1047 AH/1612-1638 AD. It was the place called Fakhri Mohalla near Gendi gate in the Walled city area where all 3 of them lived. Till date this mohalla is populated by Alavi Bohras. During the time of 26th Da'i al-Mutlaq Saiyedna Dawoodji Burhanuddin bin ‘Ajabshah (d. 997 AH/1589 AD) when Muzaffar Shah III ruled Gujarat, Saiyedi Musanji bin Taaj saheb (d. 986 AH/1578 AD) of Vadodara was martyred in the Mandvi gate when he invited Saiyedna saheb to inaugurate the mosque which he had built after returning from Hajj, avoiding Salaahuddin the then governor of Muzaffar Shah III. The mosque named Fakhri masjid is the oldest Bohra mosque in Vadodara where Alavi Bohras today offer daily prayers.

After unbearable oppression meted upon Alavi Bohras during the time of 31st Da’i al-Mutlaq Saiyedna Hasan Badruddin bin Wali in Ahmedabad, he ordered 32nd Da’i al-Mutlaq Saiyedna Jivabhai Ziyauddin bin Noohji to migrate along with the community to Vadodara. He spearheaded the cause of migration and in 1110 AH/1699 AD he established a new locality for the community where he built Ziyaai Masjid and Badri Mohalla. Badri Mohalla proved a cradle of progress and prosperity for the entire community. An Alavi Bohra who resides anywhere in the world and he visits Vadodara has to come to Badri Mohalla as the residence of Saiyedna saheb is located right in the middle of it.

Since 328 years (1110–1438 AD/1699-2017 AD), Vadodara has remained the centre and the seat of modern Alavi Bohras (ad-Da’wat ul-Haadiyat ul-‘Alaviyah) where 12 of its missionaries (du’aat) are buried here with a short interlude when 35th Da'i did Da’wat in Surat for 19 years between 1158 and 1178 AH/1745-1764 AD. Except 35th Da'i, all of them are from the progeny of Noohji bin Mohammadji, the father of 32nd Da'i. The present 45th Da'i Saiyedna Haatim Zakiyuddin saheb is the descendant from the same Aal-e-Noohji. Badri Mohalla, Fakhri Mohalla, Ajwa Road, Taiwada, Fatehgunj, Mughalwada, Pratapnagar, Panigate are the main areas of Vadodara where Alavi Bohras stay. They have 4 mosques and 3 community halls in Vadodara.

During the time of 41st Da'i al-Mutlaq Saiyedna Jivabhai Fakhruddin (d. 1347 AH/1929 AD), Gaekwadi ruler Maharaja Sayajirao III (d. 1358 AH/1939 AD) ruled Vadodara and he single-handedly spearheaded its progress and prosperity. Saiyedna maintained cordial and healthy relationship with the ruler as during the festivals Saiyedna often sent delegation in the Gaekwadi royal court to represent Alavi Bohras. This was because most of the shops of Alavi Bohras were located in the narrow streets surrounding the Mandvi area involved in the business of turban making. At that time Alavi Bohras had a monopoly of making red turban laced with golden string and Gaekwadi courtiers used to frequent these shops. Today, many Alavi Bohras are having their shops in this area inherited from their forefathers is the testimony of the social relations with Gaekwads.

=== Surat - سورة ===
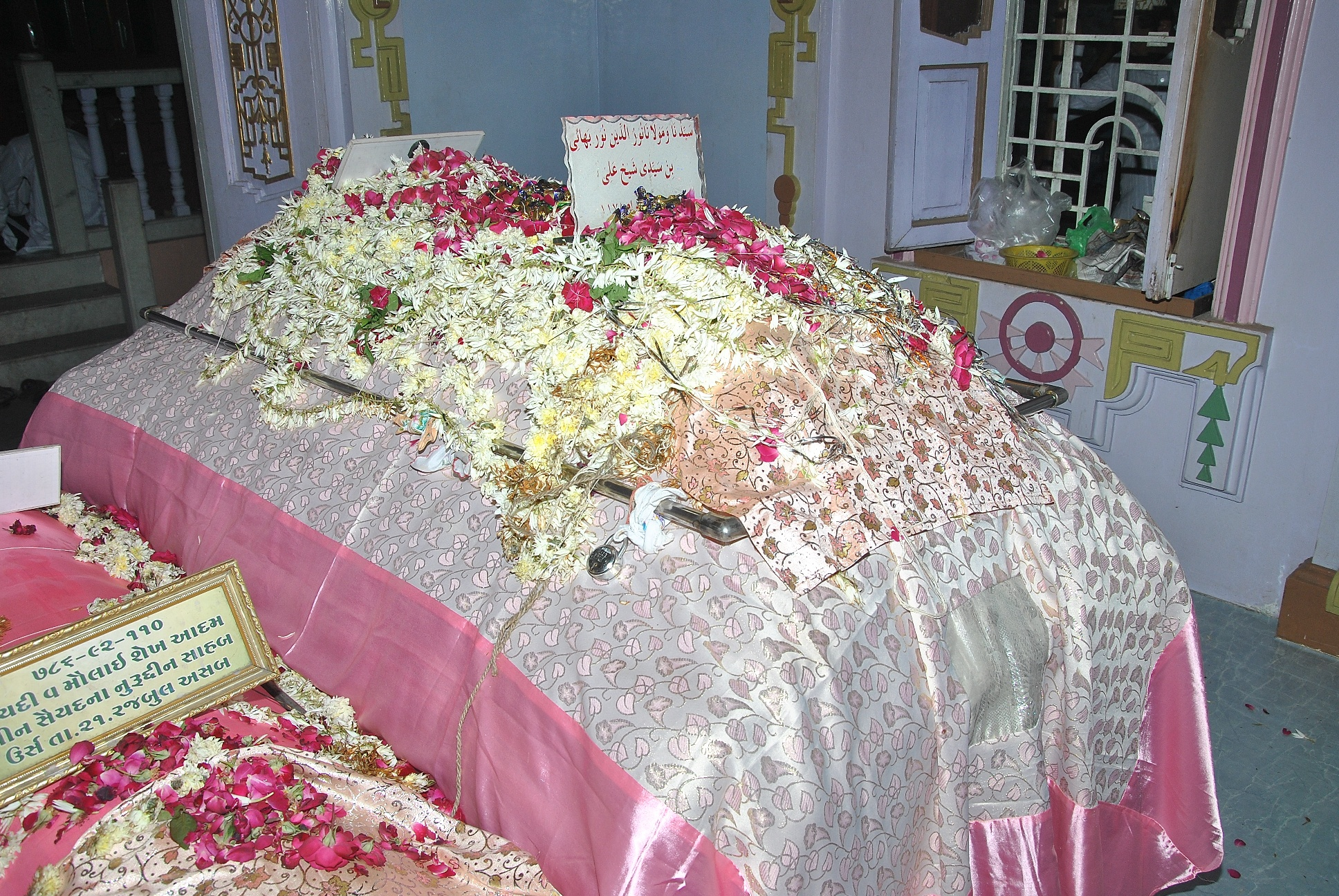
Mausoleum of 35th Alavi Da'i Saiyedna Noorbhai Nuruddin saheb in Surat

When Saiyedna Jivabhai Ziyauddin saheb, the 32nd Da'i al-Mutlaq migrated from Ahmedabad to Vadodara in 1110 AH/1699 AD, Saiyedi Shaikhali from Surat along with his son Noorbhai visited Saiyedna saheb when he was busy constructing the mosque at the corner of Badri Mohalla named Masjid-e-Ziyaai. During that time Noorbhai was very young and with pure intellect he witnessed the spiritual supremacy of Saiyedna saheb. Saiyedna saheb ordered Saiyedi Shaikhali to leave Noorbhai in Vadodara for religious education and training and granted him all the permissions to carry out community responsibilities of Surat. Saiyedi Shaikhali was a successful merchant but at the same time an ardent follower of Saiyedna saheb. Along with many Alavi Bohra families, he stayed in Noorpura Mohalla near Jhapa bazaar. In the same area there was a mosque, graveyard and musaafir-khaana that were managed by Saiyedi Shaikhali. After his death, Alavi Bohras of Surat relied upon Noorbhai for all Da’wat affairs as he was among the most trusted Hudood of Saiyedna saheb, the 33rd Da'i Hebatullaah Mo'ayyaduddin.

Saiyedna Hebatullaah Mo'ayyaduddin, conferred him the status of Mukaasir by bestowing him the epithet of "Nuruddin-نورالدین (the light of religion)". He often visited Vadodara along with the people of Surat and used to give oath of loyalty to Saiyedna saheb. Surat city became the centre of Alavi Bohras, though for a short period of time i.e. 19 years was only because of the pure heartedness and trustworthiness of Noorbhai Nuruddin, the 35th Da'i of Alavi Bohras. This was the time when Surat witnessed the transition period from Mughal rule to British dominion and the place where Saiyedna Noorbhai Nuruddin lived in the railway station area near Tapti River is considered the oldest area of the city and it is from here that the development of the city started in the early 20th century AD. After his death in 1178 AH/1764 AD, his son Shaikh Adam stayed in Surat and looked after the community like his father and grandfather. During this time there were around 50 Alavi Bohra families staying in Surat. The centre again got transferred to Vadodara and majority of Alavi Bohras migrated there along with their identity and surname as “Surtis”. Today the tomb of Saiyedna Noorbhai Nuruddin is the most revered place where mosque, community hall and musaafir-khaana are situated. For divine blessings every Alavi Bohra visit this place once in a year. Every year on the occasion of ‘Urs Mubaarak (death anniversary) of Saiyedna Noorbhai Nuruddin in Moharram a grand function is held in Surat where Alavi Bohras participate with great fervor and faith.

No.	Name of the Da'i (Saiyedna – سیدنا)	Death – تأریخ الإنتقال	Place of the Tomb – قبر مبارک	Period of Da'wat – مدۃ الدعوۃ	Licentiate – مأذون	Associate – مکاسر	Works – تألیفات
32.	Jivabhai Ziyauddeen bin Noohji	10 Zul Qa’adah 1130 AH – 4/10/1718 AD	Bustaan-e-Badri, Wadi	40 yrs 6 mts 20 days	Hebatullaah Moaiyad Fiddeen bin Jivabhai Ziyauddeen	Jalaal Shehaabuddeen bin Noohji	
33.	Hebatullaah Moaiyad Fiddeen bin Jivabhai Ziyauddin	17 Rajab 1151 AH – 30/10/ 1738 AD	Bustaan-e-Badri, Wadi	20 yrs 8 mts 7 days	Jalaal Shehaabuddeen bin Noohji	Noorbhai Nooruddeen bin Shaikhali	
34.	Jalaal Shehaabuddeen bin Nuhji	14 Safar 1158 AH – 17/3/1745 AD	Jannat ul-Mumineen, Pratapnagar	6 yrs 6 mts 27 days	Shamsuddeen Hameeduddeen bin Hebatullaah Moaiyad Fiddeen	Noorbhai Nooruddeen bin Shaikhali	
35.	Noorbhai Nooruddeen bin Shaikhali	9 Moharram 1178 AH – 7/7/ 1764 AD	SURAT	19 yrs 10 mts 24 days	Shamsuddeen Hameeduddeen bin Hebatullaah Moaiyad Fiddeen	Shaikh Adam bin Nooruddeen	as-Saheefat un-Nooraaniyah – الصحیفۃ النورانیۃ
36.	Shamsuddeen Hameeduddeen bin Moaiyad Fiddeen Hebatullaah	26 Sha'baan 1189 AH – 20/10/1775 AD	Bustaan-e-Badri, Wadi	11 yrs 7 mts 17 days	Shaikh Adam bin Nooruddeen	Shaikhali Shamsuddeen bin Shamsuddeen Hameeduddeen	
37.	Shaikhali Shamsuddeen bin Shamsuddeen Hameeduddeen	25 Rajab 1248 AH – 17/12/1832 AD	Bustaan-e-Badri, Wadi	58 yrs 10 mts 28 days	Shamsuddeen Hameeduddeen bin Shaikhali Shamsuddeen	Najmuddeen Mufeeduddeen bin Shaikhali Shamsuddeen	Kitaab ul-Miraas – کتاب المیراث
38.	Shamsuddeen Hameeduddeen bin Shaikhali Shamsuddeen	30 Ramazaan 1252 AH – 7/1/1837 AD	Bustaan-e-Badri, Wadi	4 yrs 2 mts 5 days	Najmuddeen Mufeeduddeen bin Shaikhali Shamsuddeen	Abdurraheem bin Shaikhali Shamsuddeen	
39.	Najmuddeen Mufeeduddeen bin Shaikhali Shamsuddeen	6 Rajab 1282 AH – 24/11/1865 AD	Jannat ul-Mumineen, Pratapnagar	29 yrs 9 mts 6 days	Ameeruddeen Ameenuddeen bin Najmuddeen Mufeeduddeen	Sharafuddeen bin Najmuddeen Mufeeduddeen	as-Saheefat un-Najmiyah – الصحیفۃ النجمیۃ
40.	Ameeruddeen Ameenuddeen bin Najmuddeen Mufeeduddeen	18 Zul Hijjah 1296 AH – 2/12/1879 AD	Jannat ul-Mumineen, Pratapnagar	14 yrs 5 mts 12 days	Sharafuddeen bin Najmuddeen Mufeeduddeen	Jivabhai Fakhruddeen bin Ameeruddeen Ameenuddeen	
41.	Jivabhai Fakhruddeen bin Ameeruddeen Ameenuddeen	20 Shawwaal 1347 AH – 30/3/1929 AD	Bustaan-e-Badri, Wadi	50 yrs 10 mts 2 days	Sharafuddeen bin Najmuddeen Mufeeduddeen	Fidaali Badruddeen bin Jivabhai Fakhruddeen	Ta'weel-o-Salaat-e-Laylat il-Qadr – تأویل صلوۃ لیلۃ القدر
42.	Fidaali Badruddeen bin Jivabhai Fakhruddeen	8 Sha'baan 1377 AH – 26/2/1958 AD	Bustaan-e-Badri, Wadi	29 yrs 9 mts 18 days	Yoosuf Nooruddeen bin Fidaali Badruddeen	Nazarali bin Fidaali Badruddeen	
43.	Yoosuf Nooruddeen bin Fidaali Badruddeen	17 Rajab 1394 AH – 5/8/1974 AD	Mazaar-e-Yusufi, Behind Nooraani Masjid, Wadi	16 yrs 11 mts 9 days	Taiyeb Ziyauddeen bin Yoosuf Nooruddeen	Nazarali bin Fidaali Badruddeen	
44.	Tayyib Ziyauddeen bin Yoosuf Nooruddeen	5 Sha'baan 1436 AH – 23/5/2015 AD	Mazaar-e-Yusufi, Behind Nooraani Masjid, Wadi	42 yrs 18 days	Haatim Zakiyuddeen bin Taiyeb Ziyauddeen	Nazarali bin Fidaali Badruddeen, Husain Moeenuddeen bin Taiyeb Ziyauddeen, Mohammad Nooruddeen bin Taiyeb Ziyauddeen	

== Reasoning and Religiosity of Esotericism ==
Knowledge (‘ilm-علم) and wisdom (hikmah-حكمۃ) are, according to Isma’ili belief, eternal gifts from God, revealed to humanity through His prophets. God has successively dispatched six prophets bearing a law (shari’ah): Adam, Noah, Abraham, Moses, Jesus Christ and Muhammad. These prophets are ‘speakers’ (naatiq-ناطق), because they talk to men, proclaiming to them a shari’ah, an exoteric (zaahir-ظاهر) law with its commandments and prohibitions, its ritual obligation and legal definitions. By the side of each prophet-speaker stands an authorized representative (wasi or asaas-وصي، اساس) who knows and teaches eternally immutable ‘esoteric meaning’ (baatin-باطن) of all these prescriptions and regulations-though only to a small number of the elect.

Thus, Adam and his son Seth at his side, Noah and his son Shem, Abraham's wasi was his son Ishmeal, Moses's wasi was his brother Aron, and Jesus Christ's was Simon Peter. The speaker-prophet of our era is Muhammad. His wasi or asaas is his cousin and son in law ‘Ali ibn Abi Taalib. The latter's descendants are the true imams of Islamic community (ummah); they alone know and transmit the ‘esoteric meaning’ of the divine revelation proclaimed by Muhammad. The imams, whose succession continued with the Fatimid caliphs in Cairo till the 21st imam Abul Qaasim at-Taiyeb and their succession is in its place till date though in seclusion, are thus the repositories of the divine message; they are the upholders of ‘Knowledge’ and ‘Wisdom’, which they transmit to their followers, they are the ‘friends of God’ (awliya Allah-أولیاء الله).

The imams spread ‘Knowledge’ and ‘Wisdom’ based on exoteric and esoteric interpretation of divine law through ‘Summoners’, da’is, these are propagators or missionaries who summon people to follow the true imam and instruct the individual who ‘responds to the summons’, al-mustajib or the initiate, through wise sayings and necessary knowledge. The missionary or Da'i as a teacher is the most characteristic figure of the Isma’ili movement. From the very beginning, the Da'i's travelled far and wide to spread the good tidings.

Tanzeel-تنزیل (the outer text) and Tafsir-تفسیر (commentary on the Qur'an) are completely based on Ta’weel-تأویل (inner meaning), without which Tanzeel becomes void and meaningless. The belief that each and every Qur'anic verse has both outer and inner meanings similarly applies to the sayings of Mohammad which are applicable until the last Day of Doom.

As distinct from the zaahir (evident meaning) of the literal wordings of sacred texts and religious prescriptions, notably the Qur'an and the Shari’ah, the baatin is the inward, hidden or esoteric meaning having deep and stronger impact on the deeds and thoughts of the believers. In the Isma’ili-Taiyebi gnosis the word baatin goes hand in hand with ta’weel and it exclusively denotes the method of inducing the baatin for the allegorical, symbolic and esoteric interpretation or spiritual-hermeneutic exegesis of historic events and the world of nature as described by the sacred Islamic texts. Ta’weel became the hallmark of Isma’ili thought and literature. It is to manifest the hidden so as to unveil the true spiritual reality only to those who are properly initiated into the community and who have acknowledged the spiritual guidance of the rightful imam of his era or his representatives who possess the rightful authority to interpret Islam in all its dimensions. Qur'anic verses throws light on this subject in the following way:

- And bestowed His favours, external and esoteric, in abundance on you? And yet there are men who contend about God without any knowledge or guidance or the Book enlightening. (al-Qur'an 31–20)
- He is the first and He the last, the transcendent and the immanent; and He has knowledge of everything. (al-Qur'an 57–3)
- But those who are twisted of mind look for verses metaphorical, seeking deviation and giving to them interpretations of their own; but none knows their meaning except God; and those who are steeped in knowledge affirm: "We believe in them as all of them are from the Lord." But only those who have wisdom understand. (al-Qur'an 3–7)

This type of allegorical interpretation is applied on the Hadith of Mohammad:

- Unity is mercy, dissent punishment.
- The Qur'an is the real cure.
- The mosque is where the pious live.
- The pinnacle of wisdom is fear of God.
- Paradise lies beneath your mother's feet.

Numerous books are dedicated to this topic and it has been written throughout the Islamic era and the same is carried out today too by the missionaries. The distinction between the zaahir and baatin was an integral part of the religious system of thought elaborated by the Isma’ili missionaries of different periods and this particular process continued with the Taiyebis in Yemen. Below is a small example of esoteric text taken from Kitaab al-Kashf by Ja’far b. Mansur al-Yemen in the mid 4th century AH/10th century AD.

"The Qur’an begins with bismillaah al-rahmaan al-raheem (بسم الله الرحمن الرحیم); bismillaah is composed of seven letters. twelve letters emerges from this and that are al-rahmaan al-raheem. This verse is the beginning of the first chapter of Qur’an surat ul-hamd which has total seven verses. The seven letters, which are the bismillaah, signify the seven naatiq. The twelve letters that arise from these signify that for each naatiq there are twelve naqeebs or hujjats. Thus the twelve letters, which are al-rahmaan al-raheem, that arise from the seven lettered bismillaah, together become nineteen letters. This signifies that from the naatiqs – after each naatiq – seven imaams and twelve hujjats arise, which makes nineteen. The same is the case with pillars of Islam, in which there are seven pillars each having twelve traditions."

Zaahir (ظاهر)-Exoteric	Baatin (باطن)-Esoteric
Islam-إسلام	Faith
Skies-سموات	Prophets
Qur'an-قرآن	Household of Muhammad
Earth-أرض	Ali bin Abi Taalib
Temporal world-دنيا	Spiritual world
Body-جسم	Soul
Prayer-صلٰوة	Spiritual Mission
Ka’bah-كعبة	The Imam of the time
Water-ماء	Knowledge
Oath of Allegiance-ميثاق	The right path
Honeybee-نحل	Believer
Salt-ملح	Wisdom
Fruits-فواكه	The Imams from the progeny of prophets

== Library ==
The Personal Alavi Library, housed in the Residence of Saiyedna saheb is the centre of Isma'ili Studies with special reference to the Taiyebi Branch of Literature. There are various Academic and Research Institutions which carry out studies on Isma'ili Taiyebi Literature basically starting from 225 AH (c. 840 AD) until the present based on Ahaadees, Akaaleem, Riwaayaat and historic events with the assistance of renowned and experienced scholars in their respective fields. Specifically the study of Isma'ili Literature is part and parcel of the studies of Near-Eastern Languages and Culture. Generally every University that carries out these studies also includes the study of Arabic Language which is fostered by Isma'ili scholars. These specific, selective, and special studies are centered in a very few Institutions which house Isma'ili Taiyebi Manuscripts (MSS) found in Arabic.

During the second half of the 20th century AD and in recent years scholarly, critical, and significant research work is being carried out in European, American, and Middle-Eastern Universities. But it always requires second thought and important inputs based on Isma’ili dogmas from the authoritative seat of Da’wat. Scholars who are not at all in the system of Isma’ili Faith lack that special touch while dealing or summarizing or translating texts of Core Beliefs. It is because these Isma’ili literary gems had been written by Du’aat in the presence of an Imam or by his commands. It contains an Oath for the Imam on which its reader must follow and without which one is not supposed to even open a book.

As Isma'ili manuscripts held in private possessions reached scholars and researchers, the oath governing access to them was often not observed, and anyone who gained access began working on the books. Institutions that hold large collections of Isma’ili manuscripts from different periods have become centres of scholarly activity. The centre of ad-Da’wat ul-Haadiyat ul-‘Alaviyah houses several hundred manuscripts, which are managed, preserved, and conserved by the 45th Da’i al-Mutlaq Saiyedna saheb, the sole authority of Isma’ili-Taiyebi learning. This personal library contains some of the rare Islamic and Isma’ili titles and new titles are added over time. Though the centre of ‘Alavi Da’wat does not directly invite scholars or researchers from foreign universities, many foreign scholars from Iran, the United Kingdom, and the United States have come straightforwardly and studied Isma’ili titles with the Da’i himself.

The family's private collections in Yemen, Sindh, and Hind are never in direct access to the public domain nor are the manuscripts lent or shared to any aspirant of the study.

At times, when the scholars who worked for the critical study and edition of any Isma’ili title might be having only two to three manuscripts from different origins, i.e. where the writer, place and period differ, there arose the demand for the consultation of more manuscripts. For this purpose, the manuscripts of the ‘Alavi Da’wat collection, because of its Indian origin, proved more fruitful for better text reading and editing. The other salient feature of the ‘Alavi Library is that it is housed at the Da’i's residence and most of the manuscripts are copied by the Du’aat from those which were brought to Vadodara when the Da’wat headquarters were shifted from Ahmedabad.

It has been well-preserved and well-maintained by the Da’i's great efforts. Like many other places where such manuscripts were bundled for centuries and remained under lock-and-key and were never referred to or studied, the case is entirely different here. At the ‘Alavi Library, the Da’i consults and refers to these manuscripts and accordingly copies its texts in individual papers for lecturing purposes and hands over certain old manuscripts to his close aides to make a fresh copy by penning the entire text. With age-old methods the preservation of the manuscripts is carried out. As the Da’i personally handles all library affairs, the question of precaution, curing, or fumigation never arises. But the Du’aat felt it compulsory to make a copy of every manuscript as there was a constant fear of a single copy being damaged by any unexpected accident or worm attack. Every year more and more manuscripts are added to the collection and also they are copied as and when required.

The manuscripts copied by the 45th Da'i al-Mutlaq Saiyedna Haatim Zakiyuddin saheb since 1405 AH/1985 AD:

Sr. No.	Name – اسم الکتاب	Saiyedna (Author) – اسم سیدنا المؤلف
1.	Asaas ut-Ta'weel – اساس التأویل	Qaadi an-No'maan bin Mohammad
2.	Munirat ul-Basaa'ir – منیرۃ البصائر	as-Sultaan al-Khattaab
3.	al-Ibtidaa wal Intihaa – الإبتداء و الإنتھاء	Hebatullaah al-Mo'ayyad ash-Shiraazi
4.	Nahj ul-'Ibaadah – نھج العبادۃ	Hebatullaah al-Mo'ayyad ash-Shiraazi
5.	Risaalat un-Naqd – رسالۃ النقد	Haatim bin Ibraahim al-Haamedi
6.	Risaalat ul-Muqezah – رسالۃ الموقظۃ	Sharafuddin bin Hamzah
7.	Ziyaa ul-Basaa'ir – ضیاء البصائر	Idrees 'Imaaduddin bin Hasan
8.	Asraar ul-Imaam il-Mahdi – أسرار الإمام المھدي	Imam 'Abdullaah al-Mahdi
9.	Risaalat ul-Amn min al-Hayrat – رسالۃ الأمن من الحیرۃ	Ya'qub as-Sijistaani

== Islamic calendar: occasions and commemoration as per the calculation of Fatimid imams ==
Months – شھور	Date – تأریخ	Events – واقعات
1. Moharram ul-Haraam – محرم الحرام	1	New Year; Urs Mubaarak of Da'i al-Balaagh Maulaai 'Abdullaah – Khambhat
	2–9	Daily Majlis conducted in the presence of Da'i al-Mutlaq Saiyedna saheb where detailed account of Shohadaa-e-Karbalaa – شھداء کربلاء is presented coupled with the Admonition and Explanation of Shari'ah laws and Tenets
	10	Yaum-e-Aashuraa – یوم عاشوراء: The holy martyrdom of 2nd Fatimid Imam Shaah-e-Karbalaa Maulaana Husain – d. 61 AH – Karbalaa Mo'allaa; Urs Mubaarak of 1st Da'i al Mutlaq Saiyedna Zoeb bin Moosa saheb – d. 546 AH/1151 AD – Haws Mubaarak – Yemen
	13	Birth of 20th Fatimid Imam Maulaana Aamir – 490 AH/1097 AD, Cairo
	15	Birth of 15th Fatimid Imam Maulaana Nazaar al-Azeez – 344 AH/955 AD, Cairo
	16	Urs Mubaarak of 3rd Da'i al-Mutlaq Saiyedna Haatim Mohiyuddin bin Saiyedna Ibraahim saheb – d. 596 AH/1199 AD – Hutayb Mubaarak – Yemen
	18	Urs Mubaarak of 3rd Fatimid Imam Saiyed ur-Raake'een was Saajedeen Maulaana Ali Zayn ul-Aabedeen – d. 94 AH/712 AD – Jannat ul-Baqee' – Madinat ul Munawwarah
	20	Urs Mubaarak of 35th Da'i al-Mutlaq Saiyedna Nuruddin Noorbhai bin Shaikh Ali saheb – d. 1178 AH/1764 – Surat; Birth of 19th Fatimid Imam Maulaana Ahmad al-Musta'ali – 467 AH/1074 AD, Cairo
	22	Birth of Ra's ul-Hudood Dr. Hakeemuddin Bhaisaheb Zulqarnain saheb – 1400 AH/1979 AD – Vadodara, Gujarat
	23	Urs Mubaarak of Saiyedi Hasan Feer saheb Shaheed – d. 795 AH/1392 AD – Denmaal, Gujarat; Urs Mubaarak of Noor Bibi (Mother of 24th Da'i al-Mutlaq al-Yemeni Saiyedna Yusuf Najmuddin bin Sulaymaan) and Faatimah Bibi (Sister of the said Saiyedna saheb) – Dandi gaam (Maai saheb, Navsari)
	27	Urs Mubaarak of Da'i al-Balaagh Saiyedi Fakhruddin saheb Shaheed – Galiyakot, Rajasthan
	28	Urs Mubaarak of Saiyedi Musanji bin Taaj saheb Shaheed – Vadodara, Gujarat
2. Safar ul-Muzaffar – صفر المظفر	2	Urs Mubaarak of 18th Da'i al-Mutlaq Saiyedna Ali Shamsuddin bin Saiyedna Abdullaah – d. 832 AH/1428 AD – Shaareqah, Yemen; Urs Mubaarak of Saiyedna as-Sultaan al-Khattaab bin Hasan – d. 533 AH/1138 – Yemen
	14	Urs Mubaarak of 34th Da'i al-Mutlaq Saiyedna Jalaal Shehaabuddin bin Saiyedi Nuhji saheb – d. 1158 AH/1745 AD – Jannat ul-Mumineen (Pratapnagar, Vadodara); Urs Mubaarak of Kaka Akela – Kaki Akela saheb – Khambhat
	17	Urs Mubaarak of 19th Fatimid Imam Maulaana Ahmad al-Musta'ali – d. 495 AH/1101 AD – al-Qaaherah al-Mo'izziyah – Cairo
	18	Urs Mubaarak of Maulaatona Sakinah, the daughter of Imam Husain
	20	Arba'een – Chehlum of Saiyed ush-Shohadaa Maulaana Imam Husain
	22	Urs Mubaarak of 8th Da'i al-Mutlaq Saiyedna Husain bin Saiyedna Ali saheb – d. 667 AH/1268 AD – San'aa (Yemen)
	25	Urs Mubaarak of Khateebat-o-Karbalaa Maulaatona Zainab
	27	Urs Mubaarak of 23rd Da'i al-Mutlaq Saiyedna Mohammad Ezzuddin bin Saiyedna Hasan saheb – d. 946 AH/1539 – Zabeed (Yemen)
	29	Urs Mubaarak of Maulaana Imam Hasan al-Mujtabaa – d. 49 AH/669 AD – Jannat ul-Baqee' – Madinat ul Munawwarah
3. Rabi' ul-Awwal – ربیع الأول	2	Urs Mubaarak of Khaatim ul-Ambiyaa Saiyed ul-Awliyaa Muhammad – d. 11 AH/632 AD – Madinat ul Munawwarah and his Birth in Makkat ul Mukarramah in 1 'Aam ul-Feel/570 AD
	3	Birth of 16th Fatimid Imam Maulaana Husain al-Haakim – 375 AH/985 AD – al-Qaaherah al-Mo'izziyah, Cairo
	8	Birth of 45th Da'i al-Mutlaq Saiyedna Haatim Zakiyuddin saheb (the incumbent missionary of Alavi Bohras) – 1379 AH/1959 AD – Vadodara, Gujarat
	12	Urs Mubaarak of 6th Da'i al-Mutlaq Ali bin Hanzalah saheb – d. 626 AH/1229 AD – Hamdaan (Yemen)
	14	Urs Mubaarak of Saiyedi Miyaji bin Taaj saheb – Umreth, Gujarat
	15	Urs Mubaarak of 11th Fatimid Imam Maulaana Abdullaah al-Mahdi – d. 322 AH/934 AD – Mahdiyah, North Africa
	17	Birth of 5th Fatimid Imam, Maulaana Imam Abu Abdillaah Ja'far us-Saadiq – 83 AH/702 AH – Madinat ul Munawwarah
	22	Urs Mubaarak of Mukaasir ud-Da'wat Saiyedi Nazarali Bhaisaheb Najmuddin – d. 1397 AH/1977 AD – Jannat ul-Mumineen (Pratapnagar, Vadodara)
4. Rabi' ul-Aakhar – ربیع الآخر	4	Milaadayn Kareemayn – میلادین کریمین : Two Birthdays – Birth of Maulaana Imam uz-Zamaan Abul Qaasim Taiyeb ul-'Asre wal Heen – 524 AH/1130 AD – al-Qaaherah al-Mo'izziyah and Birth of 44th Da'i al-Mutlaq al-Alavi al-Faatemi Saiyedna Abu Haatim Taiyeb Ziyauddin saheb – 1351 AH/1932 AD – Badri Mohalla, Wadi, Vadodara (Gujarat, India)
	11	Urs Mubaarak of 14th Fatimid Imam Maulaana Ma'ad al-Mo'iz – d. 365 AH/975 AD – al-Qaaherah al-Mo'izziyah, Cairo
	16	Urs Mubaarak of 25th Da'i al-Mutlaq Saiyedna Fakhruddin Jalaal bin Hasan saheb – d. 975 AH/1567 AD – Ahmedabad
	19	Urs Mubaarak of 31st Da'i al-Mutlaq Saiyedna Badruddin Hasan bin Wali saheb – d. 1090 AH/1679 AD – Ahmedabad
	27	Urs Mubaarak of 26th Da'i al-Mutlaq Saiyedna Burhaanuddin Dawood bin Ajabshah saheb – d. 997 AH/1589 AD – Ahmedabad
5. Jumaadi ul-Ulaa – جمادي الأولی	1	Urs Mubaarak of 7th Da'i al-Mutlaq Saiyedna Ahmad bin Mubaarak saheb – d. 627 AH/1230 AD – Hamdaan (Yemen)
	11	Urs Mubaarak of Saiyedi Nuruddin saheb – Dongaam (Aurangabad)
	12	Urs Mubaarak of Saiyedato Nisaa il-Aalameen, Umm ul-A'immat il-Mayaameen, Maulaatona Faatimah az-Zahraa bint Mohammad ul-Mustafaa – d. 11 AH/632 AD – Madinat ul Munawwarah
6. Jumaadi ul-Ukhraa – جمادي الأخری	14	Urs Mubaarak of Gunj Shohadaa – Ahmedabad
	15	Urs Mubaarak of 27th Da'i al-Mutlaq Saiyedna Burhaanuddin Dawoodji bin Qutubshah saheb – d. 1021 AH/1612 AD – Ahmedabad
	20	Birth of Umm ul-A'immah Ziyaa ul-Madeenah Maulaatona Faatimah az-Zahraa – 5 Year of Nubuwat/614 AD – Makkat ul-Mukarramah
	25	44th Da'i al-Mutlaq Saiyedna Taiyeb Ziyauddin saheb (d. 1436 AH/2015 AD) became the first Indian Da'i who along with his Mazoon and Mukaasir took the longest pilgrimage tour-زیارات مقدسات covering all the holy places for 45 days
	27	Urs Mubaarak of Da'i al-Balaagh Saiyedna Lamak bin Maalik saheb – d. 510 AH/1116 AD – Hamadaan, Yemen
	28	Urs Mubaarak of Da'i al-Balaagh Saiyedna Yahyaa bin Lamak saheb – d. 520 AH/1126 – Hamadaan, Yemen; Urs Mubaarak of 7th Da'i al-Mutlaq Saiyedna Ahmad bin Mubaarak saheb – d. 627 AH/1230 AD – Hamadaan, Yemen
	29	Urs Mubaarak of Da'i ad-Du'aat Qaazi al-Quzaat Saiyedna Qaazi No'maan bin Mohammad at-Tameemi al-Maghrebi – d. 363 AH/974 AD, Cairo
7. Rajab ul-Murajjab – رجب المرجب	6	Urs Mubaarak of 39th Da'i al-Mutlaq Saiyedna Mufeeduddin Najmuddin bin S Shaikhali saheb – d. 1282 AH/1865 AD – Jannat ul-Mumineen (Pratapnagar, Vadodara)
	7	Urs Mubaarak of 28th Da'i al-Mutlaq Saiyedna Shaikh Aadam Safiyuddin bin Taiyeb shah saheb – d. 1030 AH/1621 AD – Saraspur, Ahmedabad
	13-14-15	Ayyaam ul-Beez – أیام البیض : Wilaadat (birth) of Ameer ul-Mumineen Maulaana 'Ali bin Abi Taalib in Ka'batullaah – 30 'Aam ul-Feel and Fasting of Umm-e-Daawood
	14	Urs Mubaarak of Da'i al-Balaagh Saiyedi Ya'qoob saheb – Patan; Urs Mubaarak of 14th Da'i al-Mutlaq Saiyedna Abdul Muttalib Najmuddin bin S. Mohammad saheb – d. 755 AH/1354 AD – Hisn-e-Zimarmar, Yemen
	15	8 Rak'aat Prayer of afternoon – صلوۃ الزوال : The day when Maulaatona Faatimah bint Asad came out from Ka'batullaah holding Maulaana 'Ali in her hands
	17	Urs Mubaarak of 43rd Da'i al-Mutlaq Saiyedna Yusuf Nooruddin bin S. Badruddin saheb – d. 1394 AH/1974 AD – Mazaar-e-Yusufi, Badri Mohalla, Vadodara; Urs Mubaarak of 33rd Da'i al-Mutlaq Saiyedna Mo'ayyaduddin Hebatullaah bin S. Ziyauddin saheb – d. 1151 AH/1738 AD – Bustaan-e-Badri, Wadi, Vadodara
	18	Urs Mubaarak of 13th Da'i al-Mutlaq Saiyedna Ali Shamsuddin bin S. Ibraaheem saheb – d. 746 AH/1345 AD – Hisn-e-Zimarmar, Yemen
	21	Urs Mubaarak of Saiyedi Shaikh Aadam bin S. Nooruddin saheb – Surat; Urs Mubaarak of Mazoon ud-Da'wat Saiyedi Bhaisaheb Sharafuddin bin S. Najmuddin saheb – Jannat ul-Mumineen (Pratapnagar, Vadodara); Mohtaramah Maa-sahebah Keebu bint Sharafuddin, Zawjat-e-Saiyedna Badruddin saheb – Jannat ul-Mumineen (Pratapnagar, Vadodara)
	25	Urs Mubaarak of 37th Da'i al-Mutlaq Saiyedna Shamsuddin Shaikhali bin S. Shamsuddin saheb – d. 1248 AH/1832 AD – Bustaan-e-Badri, Wadi, Vadodara
	26	Laylat ul-Mab'as or Laylat ul-Israa wal Me'raaj – لیلۃ المبعث، لیلۃ الإسراء و المعراج – Great night of the Ascention of Mohammad to the 8 Heavens
	27	Yaum ul-Mab'as – یوم المبعث and Fasting : First Aayat of Qur'an i.e. the beginning of سورۃ العلق was revealed on Ghaar-e-Hiraa, Mohammad was honoured as Nabi and Master of all Ambiyaa – 40 'Aam ul-Feel/610 AD – Makkat ul Mukarramah
8. Sha'baan ul-Kareem – شعبان الکریم	5	Birthday of 2nd Imam, Maulaana Husain Saiyed ush-Shohadaa – 4 AH/626 AD – Madinah; Birthday of 3rd Imam, Maulaana 'Ali Zayn ul-Aabedeen – 33 AH/654 AD – Madinah; Urs Mubaarak of 44th Da'i al-Mutlaq Saiyedna Abu Haatim Taiyeb Ziyauddin saheb – d. 1436 AH/2015 AD – Mazaar-e-Yusufi, Behind Nooraani Masjid, Vadodara
	7	Inauguration of the mausoleum of 42nd Da'i al-Mutlaq Saiyedna Badruddin Fidaali located at Bustaan-e-Badri, Wadi, Vadodara in 1435 AH/2014 AD on the hands of 44th Da'i Saiyedna Taiyeb Ziyauddin saheb – d. 1436 AH/2015 AD
	8	Urs Mubaarak of 42nd Da'i al-Mutlaq Saiyedna Badruddin Fidaali bin S Fakhruddin saheb – d. 1377 AH/1958 AD – Bustaan-e-Badri, Wadi, Vadodara
	10	Inauguration of Masjid e Badri, Worli, Mumbai in 1435 AH/2014 AD on the hands of 44th Da'i Saiyedna Taiyeb Ziyauddin saheb – d. 1436 AH/2015 AD
	14	Laylat un-Nisf {Shab-e-Baraat} – لیلۃ النصف. A special prayer of 14 Rak'aat called Washsheq
	15	Yaum-e-Tahweel ul-Qiblah – یوم تحویل القبلۃ: Ka'batullaah became the Qiblah of Islam in 2 AH/624 AD – Madinah; Marriage of Maulaana 'Ali Ameer ul-Mumineen with Daughter of Muhammad, Maulaatona Faatimah az-Zahraa – 2 AH/624 AD – Madinah; Urs Mubaarak of 17th Faatemi Imam Maulaana 'Ali az-Zaahir – d. 427 AH/1036 AD – al-Qaaherah al-Mo'izziyah, Cairo; Urs Mubaarak of 20th Da'i al-Mutlaq Saiyedna Hasan Badruddin bin S. Idrees saheb – d. 918 AH/1512 AD – Masaar, Yemen
	16	Urs Mubaarak of 2nd Da'i al-Mutlaq Saiyedna Ibraaheem bin Husain al-Haamedi saheb – d. 557 AH/1162 AD – Ghail-e-Bani Haamid, Yemen
	20	Saiyedna Haatim Zakiyuddin saheb took the reign of Da'wat e 'Alaviyah as a 45th Da'i al-Mutlaq by taking Oath of Allegiance of the community in Masjid e Nooraani, Wadi, Vadodara in 1436 AH/2015 AD
	22	Urs Mubaarak of Saiyedatona Hurrat ul-Malekah Arwa binte Ahmad saheba. Hujjat of 20th Faatemi Imam Maulaana Mansoor al-Aamir – d. 532 AH/1138 AD – Zi-Jablah, Yemen. Beginning of Da'wat e Itlaaqiyah.
	26	Urs Mubaarak of 36th Da'i al-Mutlaq Saiyedna Hameeduddin Shamsuddin bin S Hebatullaah saheb – d. 1189 AH/1775 AD – Bustaan-e-Badri, Wadi, Vadodara
	27	Urs Mubaarak of 5th Da'i al-Mutlaq Saiyedna Ali bin Mohammad bin al-Waleed saheb – d. 612 AH/1215 AD – Haraaz, Yemen
9. Ramazaan ul-Mo'azzam – رمضان المعظم	5	14th Fatemi Imam Maulaana Ma'ad al-Mo’iz entered the city of Cairo and offered prayers in his Palace. The city of Cairo got its name from him as al-Qaaherah al- Mo’izziyah
	7	By the order of Imam al-Mo’iz, Jaame’-e-Azhar was inaugurated by Maulaana al-Qaa’id Jawhar in Cairo that became the Capital of Fatemi Sultanate. Usage of Misri Calendar was officiated in the entire Hukumat. Azaan was said publicly with the recitation of "Mohammadun wa 'Aliyun Khayr ul-Bashar wa ‘Itratohoma Khayr ul-‘Itar". Fatemi law and jurisprudence was practiced.
	8	This was the memorable day in the history of Fatemi Imamat. Under the guidance of Imam al-Mo’iz, his commander Maulaana al-Qaa’id al-Jawhar as-Saqali conquered Egypt. The foundation of Cairo was laid along with Jaame’-e-Azhar and Palaces.
	9	Urs Mubaarak of 16th Da'i al-Mutlaq Saiyedna Abdullaah Fakhruddin bin Ali saheb – d. 809 AH/1407 AD – Hisn-e-Zimarmar, Yemen
	10	Birth of 17th Fatemi Imam Maulaana 'Ali az-Zaahir in Cairo – 395 AH/1005 AD; 41st Da’i al-Mutlaq Saiyedna Fakhruddin Jivabhai bin Saiyedna Ameeruddin saheb began composing the ash'aar for the beginning (إبتداء) and ending (وداع) of Shahrullaah. Till 1332 AH/1914 AD, he completed composing 19 abyaat which is based on the 19 huroof-حروف of 'Bismillaah'. Many of these abyaat are recited in Shahrullaah
	12	Urs Mubaarak of 15th Fatemi Imam Maulaana Nazaar al-'Azeez – d. 386 AH/996 AD – al-Qaaherah al-Mo'izziyah, Cairo
	15	Birth of the 1st Fatemi Imam, Maulaana Hasan al-Mujtabaa – 3 AH/631 AD – Madinah
	16	Birth of 18th Fatemi Imam Maulaana Ma'ad al-Mustansir in Cairo – 420 AH/1029 AD – al-Qaaherah al-Mo'izziyah
	17	First battle of Islam, Battle of Badr fought in which Abul Qaasim Mohammad became victorious and the arch-enemy Abu Jahal was killed
	18	Night to offer 24 Rak'at Naafelat namaaz when Ameer ul-Mumineen Maulaana 'Ali bin Abi Taalib was severely injured in the mehrab of Masjid e Kufa
	20	24 Rak'at Naafelat namaaz, Night of the Martyrdom of Ameer ul-Mumineen Maulaana 'Ali bin Abi Taalib in Kufa in 40 AH/661 AD
	21	Martyrdom of Ameer ul-Mumineen Maulaana 'Ali bin Abi Taalib; Birth of 14th Fatemi Imam Maulaana Ma'ad al-Mo'iz in Cairo – 319 AH/931 AD
	22	Laylat ul-Qadr – لیلۃ القدر : Washsheq of 24 salaams, 20 rak'ats and Waseelah Mubaarakah
	28	Birth of Mukaasir ud-Da'wat Saiyedi Mohammad Bhaisaheb Nuruddin saheb – 1394 AH/1974 AD – Vadodara, Gujarat
	29	Urs Mubaarak of 38th Da'i al-Mutlaq Saiyedna Hameeduddin Shamsuddin bin Saiyedna Shaikhali saheb – d. 1252 AH/1837 AD – Bustaan-e-Badri, Wadi, Vadodara
	30	Night of Eid ul-Fitr – عید الفطر. Washsheq Raat of 24 rak'ats
		The night of the last Jumo'ah of Shahrullaah is the Night of Aakhri Jumo'ah: Washsheq of Wadaa'-e-Ramazaan – وداع شھر اللہ & Waseelah of Ambiyaa and the day of Jumo'ah is Aakhri Yaum ul-Jumo'ah: Waseelah of Ambiyaa
10. Shawwaal ul-Mukarram – شوال المکرم	1	'Eid ul-Fitr – عید الفطر also known as Ramazaan 'Idd (The Celebration after the 30 days of Ramazaan Fasting)
	6	Urs Mubaarak of 17th Da'i al-Mutlaq Saiyedna Hasan Badruddin bin S. Abdullaah – d. 821 AH/1418 AD – Hisn-e-Zimarmar, Yemen
	7	Urs Mubaarak of Saiyedna Mohammad bin Taaher al-Haarisi – Ma'zoon-e-Mutlaq of 3rd Da'i Saiyedna Haatim and author of the Du'aa of al-Aql al-Awwal
	8	Urs Mubaarak of 15th Da'i al-Mutlaq Saiyedna Abbaas bin S. Mohammad saheb – d. 779 AH/1378 AD – Hisn-e-Zimarmar, Yemen
	10	Urs Mubaarak of Saiyedna Hebatullaah al-Mo'ayyad ash-Shiraazi – Baab ul-Abwaab of 18th Fatimid Imam Maulaana Mustansir Billaah – d. 470 AH/1078 AD; Urs Mubaarak of 21st Da'i al-Mutlaq Saiyedna Husain Husaamuddin bin S. Idrees – d. 933 AH/1527 AD – Masaar, Yemen; Urs Mubaarak of 11th Da'i al-Mutlaq Saiyedna Ibraaheem bin S. Husain – d. 728 AH/1328 AD – Hisn-e-Af'edah, Yemen
	12	Birthday of 11th Fatimid Imam Maulaana 'Abdullaah al-Mahdi – 260 AH/874 AD
	13	Urs Mubaarak of 12th Fatimid Imam Maulaana Mohammad al-Qaa'im – d. 334 AH/946 AD – Mahdiyah, North Africa; Urs Mubaarak of 30th Da'i al-Mutlaq Saiyedna Zakiyuddin Taiyeb bin S Shaikh Aadam – d. 1047 AH/1638 AD – Saraspur, Ahmedabad; Saiyedi Ameenji bin Jalaal – Witness of the Nass-e-Jali of Saiyedna Ali saheb – d. 1031 AH/1622 AD – Saraspur, Ahmedabad; Urs Mubaarak of Mukaasir ud-Da'wat during the 44th Da'i, Saiyedi Husain Mo'eenuddin saheb – d. 1429 AH/2008 AD – Jannat ul-Mumineen, Pratapnagar, Vadodara
	20	Urs Mubaarak of 41st Da'i al-Mutlaq Saiyedna Fakhruddin bin Saiyedna Ameeruddin saheb – d. 1347 AH/1929 AD – Bustaan-e-Badri, Wadi, Vadodara. He is the Da'i who did Wa'az in Arabic-Persian simultaneously. He composed an Anthology of Poetry in Arabic, Persian, Urdu and Lisaan ud-Da’wat il-‘Alaviyah comprising many topics such as prayers, holy months, obedience, Da’wat, Da’i, Ahl ul-Bayt, misaaq, pillars of Islam, salutation, love and respect etc.
	27	Urs Mubaarak of 16th Fatimid Imam Maulaana Husain al-Haakim – d. 411 AH/1021 (Ascention towards the Heavens)
	28	Urs Mubaarak of 13th Fatimid Imam Maulaana Isma'il al-Mansoor – d. 341 AH/953 AD – Mahdiyah
11. Zulqa'adat il-Haraam – ذو القعدۃ الحرام	4	Urs Mubaarak of 20th Fatimid Imam Maulaana Mansoor al-Aamir – d. 526 AH/1132 AD – al-Qaaherah al-Mo'izziyah – Cairo
	10	Birth of Umm ul-Mumineen Mohtaramah Mokarramah Maa Saahebah Azimahbu binte Mukaasir ud-Da'wat Saiyedi Bhaisaheb Nazarali saheb – 1360 AH/1941 AD – Vadodara
	12	Urs Mubaarak of Yemeni Da'i Saiyedna Ali bin Mohammad as-Sulayhi saheb, Yemen
	13	Urs Mubaarak 9th Da'i al-Mutlaq Saiyedna Ali bin S Husain saheb – d. 682 AH/1284 AD – San'aa, Yemen
	19	Urs Mubaarak of 19th Da'i al-Mutlaq Saiyedna Idrees Imaaduddin bin S Hasan saheb – d. 872 AH/1468 AD – Shibaam, Yemen
	21	Urs Mubaarak of 22nd Da'i al-Mutlaq Saiyedna Ali Shamsuddin bin S Husain saheb – d. 933 AH/1527 AD – Masaar, Yemen; Inauguration of Masjid e Nooraani, Wadi, Vadodara in 1393 AH/1973 AD on the hands of 43rd Da'i Saiyedna Yusuf Nooruddin saheb – d. 1394 AH/1974 AD
	23	Urs Mubaarak of Da'i al-Mutlaq Shaheed-e-Aazam Saiyedna Ali Shamsuddin bin S. Ibraheem 29th saheb – d. 1046 AH/1637 AD – Ahmedabad
	25	Urs Mubaarak of 4th Da'i al-Mutlaq Saiyedna Ali Shamsuddin bin S. Haatim saheb – d. 605 AH/1209 AD – San'aa – Yemen
	29	Fasting (Roza) of Nuzool-e-Ka'batullaah (Baytullaah descended on the earth)
12. Zul Hijjat il-Haraam – ذو الحجۃ الحرام	1	Urs Mubaarak of Maa-sahebah Mohtaramah Khadeejah al-Kubraa Meethibu binte Rajabali, wife (زوجۃ طاھرۃ) of 43rd Da'i Saiyedna Yusuf Nooruddin saheb – d. 1405 AH/1985 AD – Jannat ul-Mumineen, Pratapnagar, Vadodara; Urs Mubaarak of 12th Da'i al-Mutlaq Saiyedna Mohammad bin Saiyedi Haatim – d. 729 AH/1329 AD – Hisn-e-Af'edah, Yemen
	4	Urs Mubaarak of Maa-sahebah Mohtaramah Ne'matbu binte Mukaasir ud-Da'wat Saiyedi Sharafuddin saheb, wife (زوجۃ طاھرۃ) of 41st Da'i Saiyedna Jivabhai Fakhruddin saheb – 1336 AH/1918 AD – Jannat ul-Mumineen, Patapnagar, Vadodara
	6	Urs Mubaarak of Saiyedi Khawj bin Malak saheb – 1009 AH/1601 AD – Kapadwanj, Gujarat
	9	Yaum-e-Arafah – یوم عرفۃ and Night of 'Eid ul-Azhaa – عید الاضحی. Takbeerah of the ritual slaughter (بھیمۃ الانعام) begins from the farz of Fajr prayer
	10	Yaum-e-'Eid ul-Azhaa (عید قرباني). The day of the Ritual Sacrifice of a Halaal Animal – Zabeehat (ذبیحۃ)
	13	Takbeerah ends on the farz of 'Asr prayer; Urs Mubaarak of Maulaai Firoz saheb – Ahmedabad
	16	Urs Mubaarak of Maa-sahebah Mohtaramah Raanibu binte Ghulaam Husain, wife (زوجۃ طاھرۃ) of 42nd Saiyedna Fida'ali Badruddin saheb – d. 1381 AH/1962 AD – Jannat ul-Mumineen, Patapnagar, Vadodara; Urs Mubaarak of 24th Da'i al-Mutlaq Saiyedna Yusuf Najmuddin bin Saiyedi Sulaymaan saheb – d. 974 AH/1567 AD – Taybah, Yemen. The last Taiyebi Da'i who did Da'wat in Yemen and is buried there but was born in Sidhpur, Gujarat; Dhaaro – Death Anniversary of Khaadim-e-Da'wat Naiknaam Shaikhali bin Alibhai, Jannat ul-Mumineen, Patapnagar, Vadodara
	18	'Eid ul-Walaayat – عید الولایۃ ('Eid-e-Ghadeer-e-Khumm – عید غدیر خم) – Mohammad ul-Mustafaa appointed his cousin and son-in-law 'Ali ibn Abi Taalib Ameer ul-Mumineen as his vicegerent and legatee in front of 70,000 pilgrims; Urs Mubaarak of 18th Fatimid Imam Maulaana Ma'ad al-Mustansir – d. 487 AH/1095 AD – al-Qaaherah al-Mo'izziyah, Cairo
	20	Urs Mubaarak of 40th Da'i al-Mutlaq Saiyedna Ameenuddin Ameeruddin bin Saiyedna Najmuddin saheb – 1296 AH/1879 AD – Jannat ul-Mumineen, Pratapnagar, Vadodara
	29	First night of the first month Muharram ul-Haraam of the New Year. The most important tradition to arrange Maa'edto Aal-e-Mohammad – مائدۃ آل محمد – Thaal (big plate) of different items and dishes is kept and all the members of the family sit together on the floor and take the grace – برکات and pray for the blessings, progress, health and peace in the New Year

== Salient features ==
=== The City of Vadodara ===
The Peaceful City of Vadodara (Gujarat, India) is the Centre of Da'wah Haadiyah 'Alaviyah الدعوۃ الھادیۃ العلویۃ (Alavi Bohras, Alavi Da'wat) since 1110 AH/1698 AD when 32nd Da'i e Mutlaq الداعي المطلق Saiyedna Jivabhai Ziyauddin migrated along with community members to Vadodara due to persecution and tyranny of other Muslim and Bohra communities. Saiyedna helped each and every Alavi Bohra migrant to get settled in Wadi area gifted by the Shi'a benevolent person Miya Mahmood. He constructed a Mosque, named Ziyaai Masjid at the entrance of the Mohalla (locality) called Badri Mohalla.

=== Du'aat (missionaries) after migration ===
Alavi Bohras have all the Du'aat دعاۃ from 32nd till the 44th Da'i e Mutlaq Saiyedna Taiyeb Ziyauddin buried in Vadodara except 35th Da'i whose grave is in Surat. So during these 3 centuries 12 Du'aat have their mausoleum at a single place i.e. Vadodara.

=== Da'i knows everyone ===
8000 believers of Well-Knit, Educated and Organized Alavi Bohra Worldwide Community has a distinction that their Saiyedna saheb known popularly as Aqaa Maulaa knows each and every of the community by his Name, Family, Social Status, Education and Occupation. He directly meets everyone and resolves issues with his own capacity be it Spiritual, Social, Financial, Marital or Personal. He is surrounded by his Ashaab اصحاب or believers wherever he goes and doesn't need any security.

=== Asbaaq ===
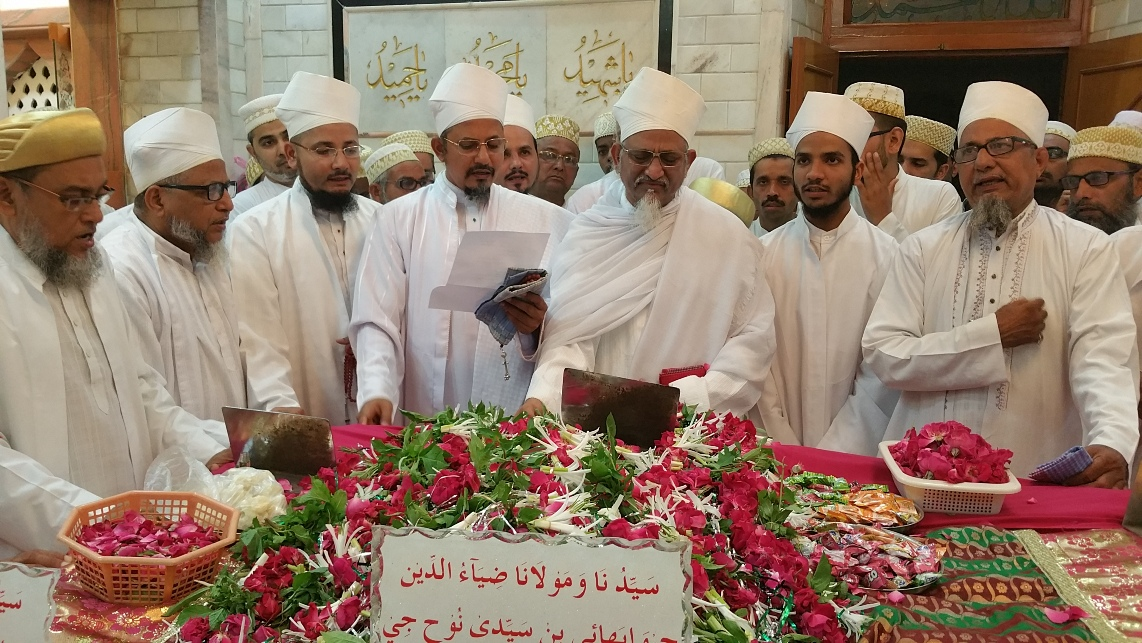
Aqaa Maulaa in the Mausoleum of 6 Du'aat in Bustaan e Badri (Vadodara) during the 'Urs Mubaarak of 32nd Da'i Saiyedna Jivabhai Ziyauddin bin Saiyedi Nuhji – 9-11-1436 AH

Asbaaq of Faith: For years together, Da'i, Mazoon, Mukaasir and Ra's ul-Hudood impart Religious Knowledge centred on Isma'ili Taiyebi Literature, dealing with Aqaa'id-عقائد (dogmas, beliefs), Sunan-سنن (traditions), Rusoomaat-رسومات (customs), Aa'maal-اعمال (deeds), Zamaan-e-Haal-زمانۂ حال (current affairs) by conducting Special as well as General Daras-درس (learning classes) weekly. Alaviyeen-علویین i.e. Believers from all walks of life come to acquire knowledge directly from Da'wah Central Authority to enhance their Intelligence and Wisdom.

=== ‘Urs Mubaarak ===
‘Urs Mubaarak-عرس مبارک is the auspicious and historic day commemorating the Death Anniversary of the holy personalities of Ahl ul-Bayt, Missionaries (Du’aat-دعاۃ) or the Deputies (Walis) of the missionaries in India during the period of Da’wat when it was in either Misr or Yemen. After the prayer of sunset (maghrib-مغرب) people gather in a mosque or in a mausoleum in the presence of Da’i al-Mutlaq to pay respect in the form of sweets, chaadar (flowery sheet), ghilaaf (decorative drape). It is a unique socio-religious festival in which Da’i al-Mutlaq (Saiyedna saheb) addresses people and makes them aware about the simple and pious life of Du’aat-دعاۃ, their works and sacrifices, their prayers and admonitions. Tenets of Isma’ili-Taiyebi faith are dealt with in detail in such gatherings such as salvation, life after this world, accounts and answers to be given to angels, paradise and hell, good and bad deeds and its reward or punishment, the day of qeyaamah (یوم القیامۃ), the proceedings of the deceased in his grave, supplication and prayer for the pardon of evil actions etc. In the gathering eulogy of the deceased holy personality (Da’i) is recited by the Zaakireen. A feast is arranged for all of them present in the majlis and Supplication of Purity (Faatihah-فاتحۃ) is recited before taking the food. In the morning, the next day after offering prayer of dawn (fajr-فجر) the same type of majlis is held but a special supplication called “Sadaqallaah-صدق اللہ” is recited for the deceased and then after paying respects a special dish called Malida is arranged for all the participants. This is the unique way to offer tribute to the deceased who had laid their lives for the Truth and Justice and to commemorate their true stories of piety and strive to get the best in the Hereafter.

=== Ten days of Moharram ===
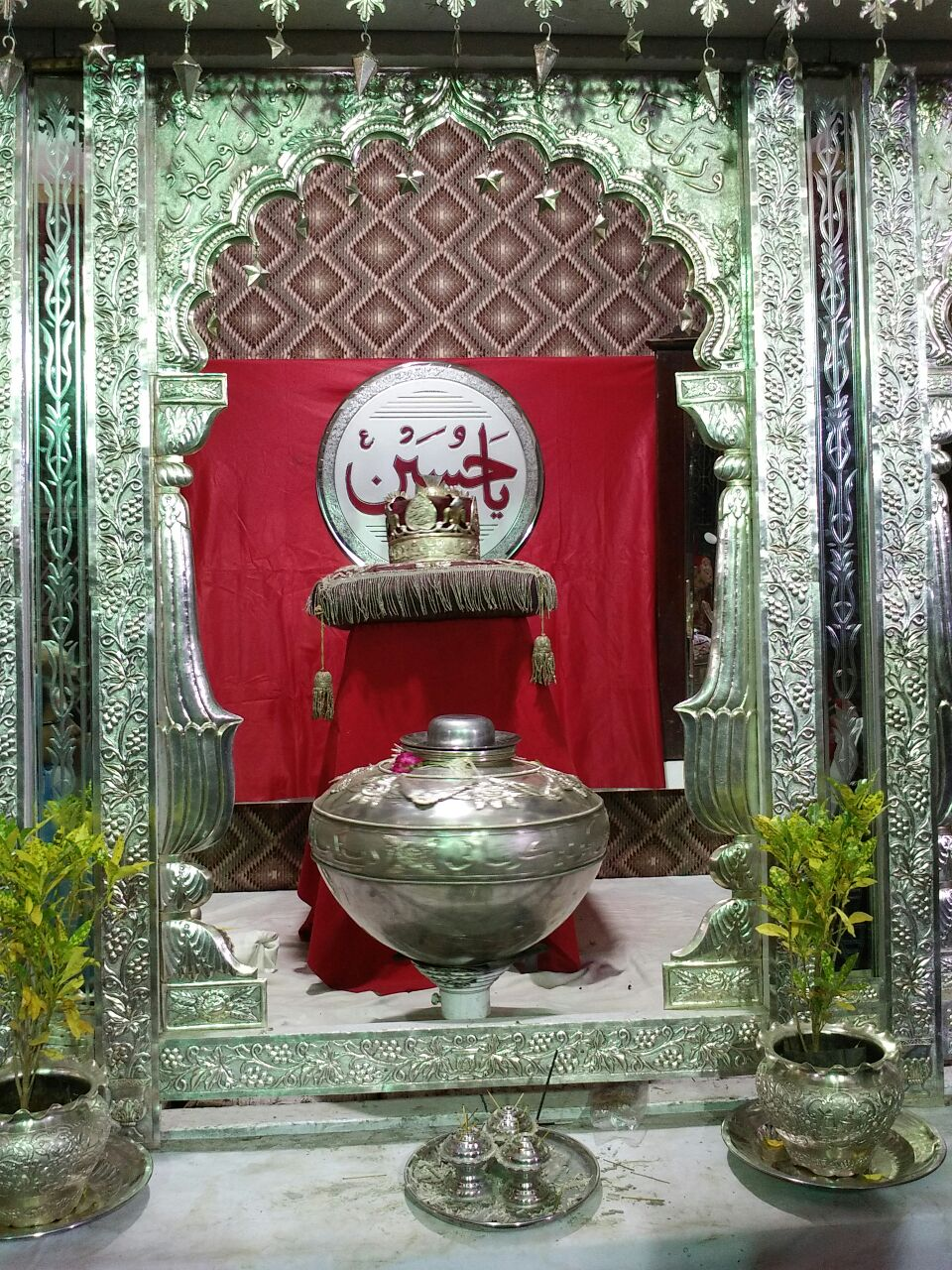
Sabeel (water-outlet with earthen pots) made up of Silver erected on the corner of Badri Mohalla every year 2 days before the day of 'Aashuraa

Moharram ul-Haraam-محرم الحرام is the first month of Islamic Lunar Year and its first ten days have a great significance in Shi’i world. When New Year is celebrated with merriment and joy, Alavi Bohras have a total different course of traditions to greet the gracefulness of the New Year. The first ten days are called ‘Asharah Mubaarakah-عشرۃ مبارکۃ as it is marked with weeping and mourning on the Martyrdom of the 2nd Imaam Abu ‘Abdillaah Husain, grandson of Muhammad in Karbalaa. 72 martyrs laid their lives for Truth against the demand of Bay’at-Oath of Allegiance by Yazeed. Till the tenth day known as Yaum e ‘Aashuraa, Da'i al-Mutlaq recites sermons and delivers lectures everyday in the morning in Jaame’ Masjid, Vadodara. Lectures encompass guidance and admonitions relating to all aspects of life and it is the golden opportunity for the community members to meet each other. All these days are packed with the religious and social activities revolving around the life and sacrifices of Ahl ul Bayt. A beautiful Sabeel-water outlet made of silver is erected every year at the entrance of Badri Mohalla conceptualized by Neknaam Shaikhali Alibhai acting on the orders od 42nd da’i Saiyedna Fidaali Badruddin in 1366 AH/1946 AD. It was first erected publicly only for a year in Mumbai at Mohammad Ali road and then it was taken to Vadodara. Alavi Bohras cook a special sweet dish "Lachko" on the first night and first day of a New Year and it is kept in a big platter-Thaal adorned with many types of dishes and fruits. On the tenth day of Moharram i.e. ‘Aashuraa a dish called "Khichdo" is cooked for the whole community at different places to commemorate the martyrdom of Maulaana Imaam Husain.

== Community at a glance ==
=== Status ===
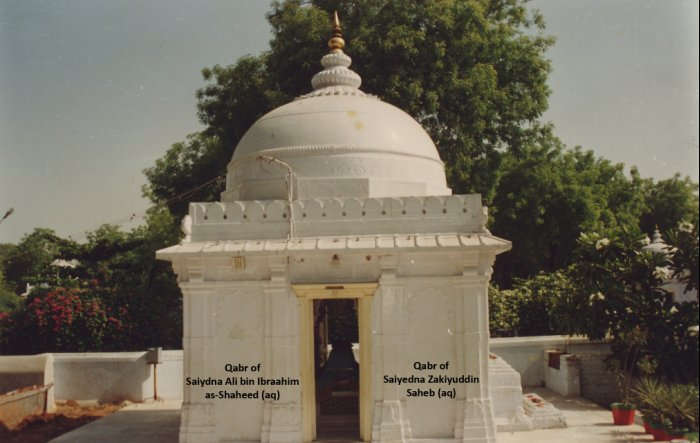
29th Da'i al-Mutlaq, the great martyr Saiyedna Ali Shamsuddin and the Court of the Mughal Emperor Jahangir

This is a minority community of Gujarat. Globally, Muslimsare in minority; among Muslims, Shi'a are a minority; among Shi'as, Isma'ilis are a minority; among Isma'ilis, Bohras are a minority; among Bohras, Alavi Bohras are a minority. Alavi Bohras are therefore a minority (Bohras) within a minority (Isma'ilis) within a minority (Shi'a) within a minority (Muslims).

=== Language ===
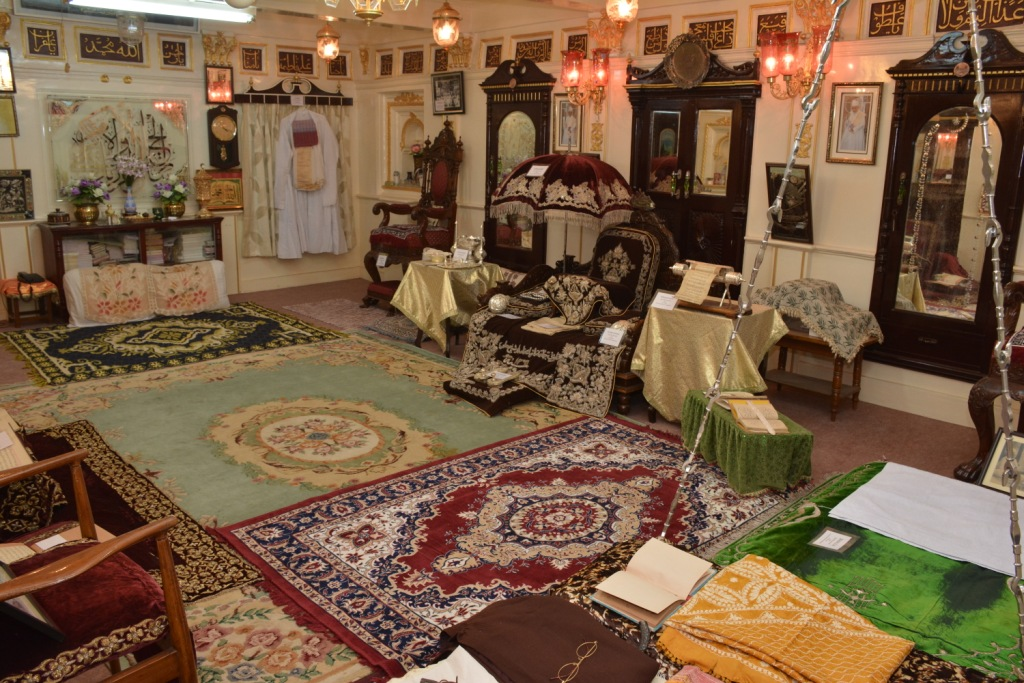
Devdi Mubaarak: Residence of Da'i al-Mutalq of Alavi Bohras since 300 yrs. This is the centre of Alavi Heritage and Culture

Lisaan ud-Da'wat il-'Alaviyah (LDA) لسان الدعوۃ العلویۃ is the unique language spoken by Worldwide Alavi Bohras. It is similar to the Gujarati language, but it is embellished, supported and structured by Arabic, Persian and Urdu words, idioms, phrases, adverbs, proverbs or sometimes the whole sentence. It is spoken among community members in homes, daily routine and socio-religious gatherings. Da'i al-Mutlaq is engaged in preservation efforts to support LDA, speaking it and encouraging others to do so.

=== Culture ===
Alavi Bohras have a culture that is unique in terms of costume, eating habits and working for livelihood. Majority of the Alavi Bohras stay in Vadodara, Gujarat and are engaged in their own business, be it their shops or factories. Learning and Education is given a lot of importance, but the preference of carrying on their family business always remains on top. There is no restriction for females as far as education, job and business is concerned, as the same is not the case in other societies and cultures. Females are given the same status and freedom as the males of the communities, but the things should be done under the Islamic practices and social framework. There are many initiatives carried out for the overall progress and development of the skills pertaining to ladies. In terms of eating habits, Alavi Bohras like each and every type of food and being a Gujarati say, "yes" to everything lawful and healthy. They are very peaceful people with no interests in behavior that is termed as unlawful in the society. They believe in "The Love for All", gives the reward as, "The Love from All".

=== Website ===
In 1425 AH/2004 AD during the time of 44th Da'i al-Mutlaq Saiyedna Abu Haatim Taiyeb Ziyauddin saheb, the website was conceptualized and launched with the sole aim of making the community and World aware of the History, Practices, Customs, Events, News, Principles, Calendar, Literature, Prayers, Business, Family and Social life, Education, Occupation etc. of Alavi Bohras. It has been controlled, edited and promoted by the office of Saiyedna saheb. Hence there remains no need to confirm any information and news of the community. It can be said that, the World gets the first-hand information directly from the Da'i himself. Since its launch it caters to each and every aspect of the community. If any layman who doesn't know the ABC of Alavi Bohras, then by visiting the website no question of his will remain unanswered. Every scholar or a researcher who is doing work on Alavi Bohras will dedfinitely have to go through this community website.

=== Mobile app ===
Exclusive mobile application "Ahl uz Zikr" was launched in June 2016 on Android as well as on iOS platform. This application has now become the main medium of connectivity between the Da’wat e Haadiyah-Chief Religious Authority and the community members. The office of Da'i saheb is gradually updating and adding all required features for community learning and development. Ahl uz Zikr has become the prime source of all Divine Knowledge apart from the community website. It includes News, Events, Farmaan, Conversation, Audio, Video, Classifieds, Calendar, Date Conversation, Namaaz Timings, History, Qiblah Direction, Supplication, Hadees, Tasbeeh counter, etc.

=== Bank ===
Alavi Bohras have a leading co-operative bank in the city of Vadodara named as 'Alavi Bohra Co-operative Bank'. It is a very popular bank among the city residents and serve as good employer for the Alavi Bohra community and its people.

== History of the Imāmī-Alāvī Bohras ==
The historical emergence of the Shī‘ah Imāmī Tāyyībī-Mustā‘lī Alāvī-Ismā'īlīs

== Gallery ==
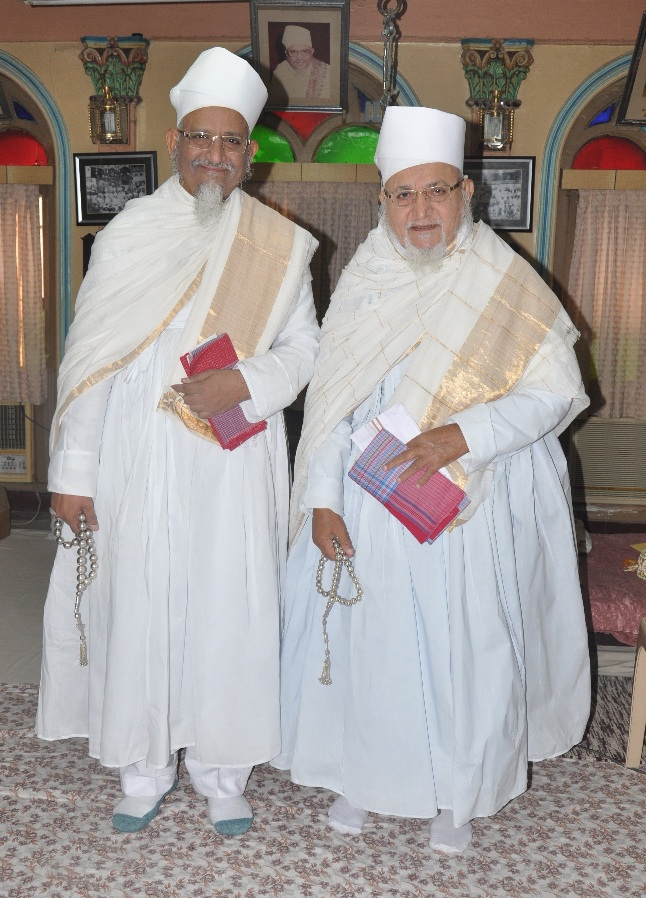
44th and 45th Da'i at the residence on Vadodara called Devdi Mubaarak - 11 Nov 2013

Alavi Bohras are marked as dark blue

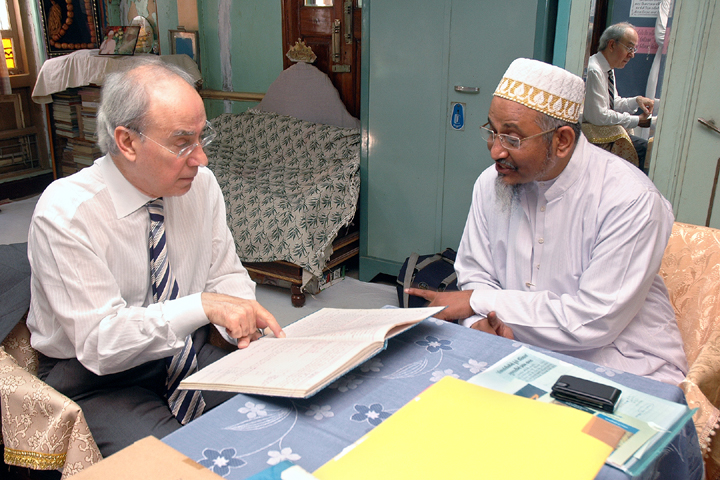
Renowned Isma'ili Scholar Dr. Farhad Daftary meets Saiyedna saheb on 26 Oct 2007 at Devdi Mubaarak, Alavi Library, the then Mazoon al-Mutlaq

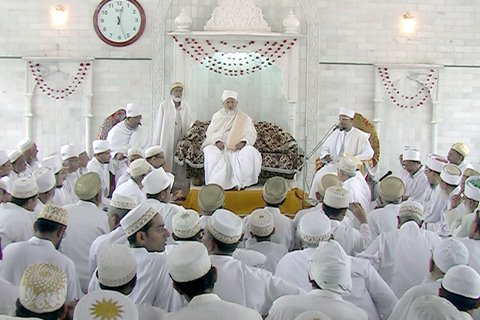
Late 44th Da'i Saiyedna Taiyeb Ziyauddin saheb in the newly constructed Masjid e Faatemi in Nadiad during its inauguration - 9 Sep 2007

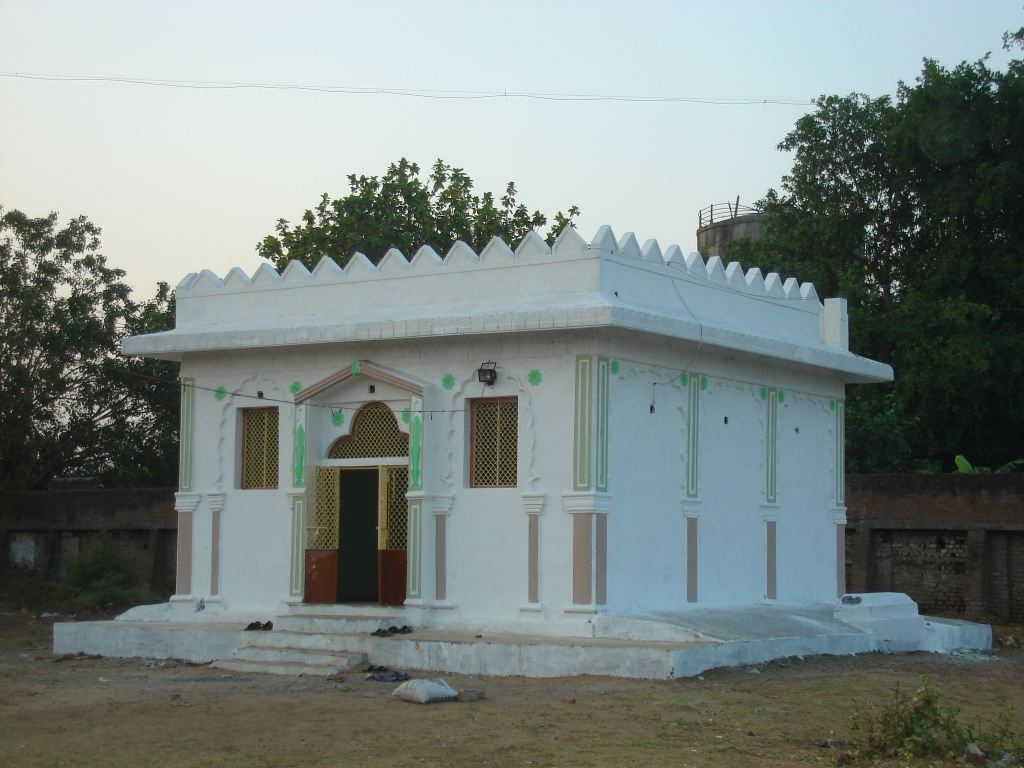
The holy tomb of 31st 'Alavi Da'i Saiyedna Hasan Badruddin saheb at Saraspur, Ahmedabad - 24 Apr 2008

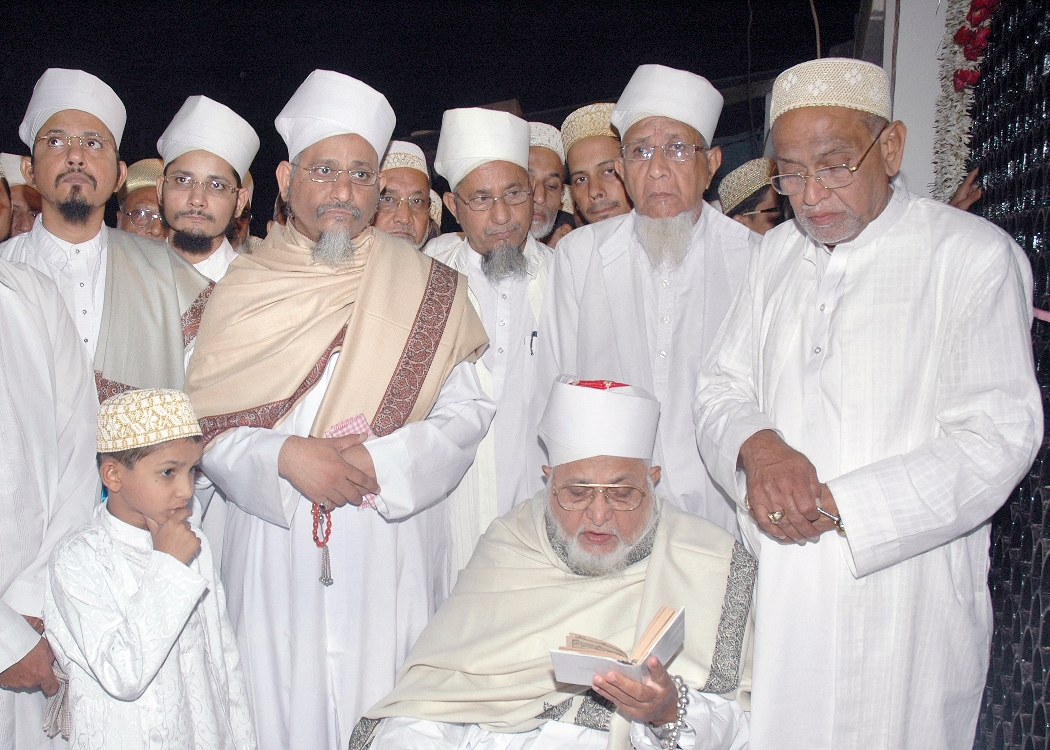
44th 'Alavi Da'i Saiyedna Taiyeb Ziyauddin saheb reciting Du'aa near Shehaabi Masjid, Pratapnagar, Vadodara - 16 Dec 2008

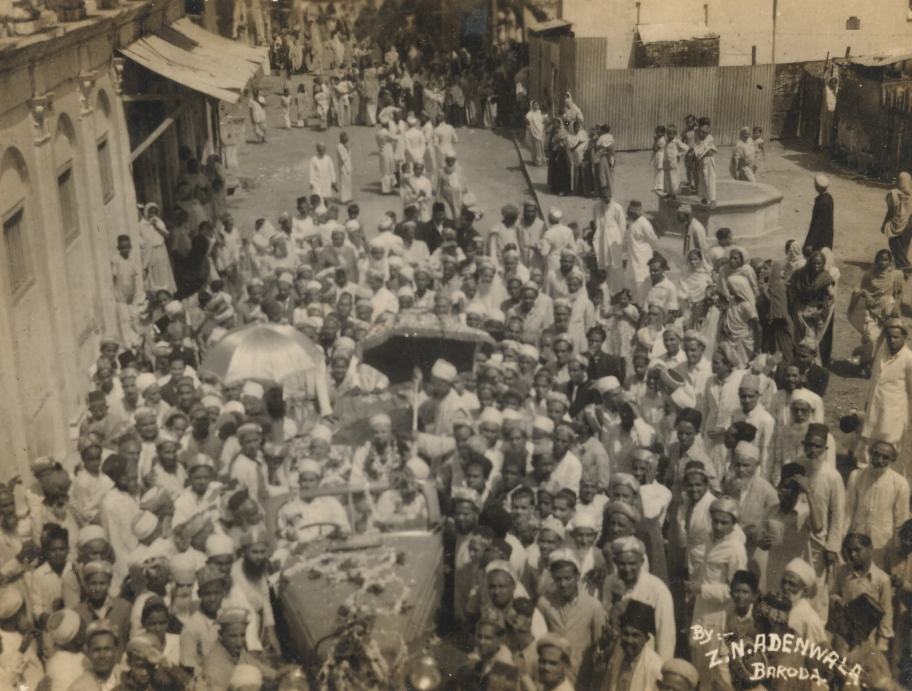
42nd Da'i al-Mutlaq Saiyedna Fidaali Badruddin going for Hajj Pilgrimage on 1-10-1947 from Badri Mohalla, Vadodara

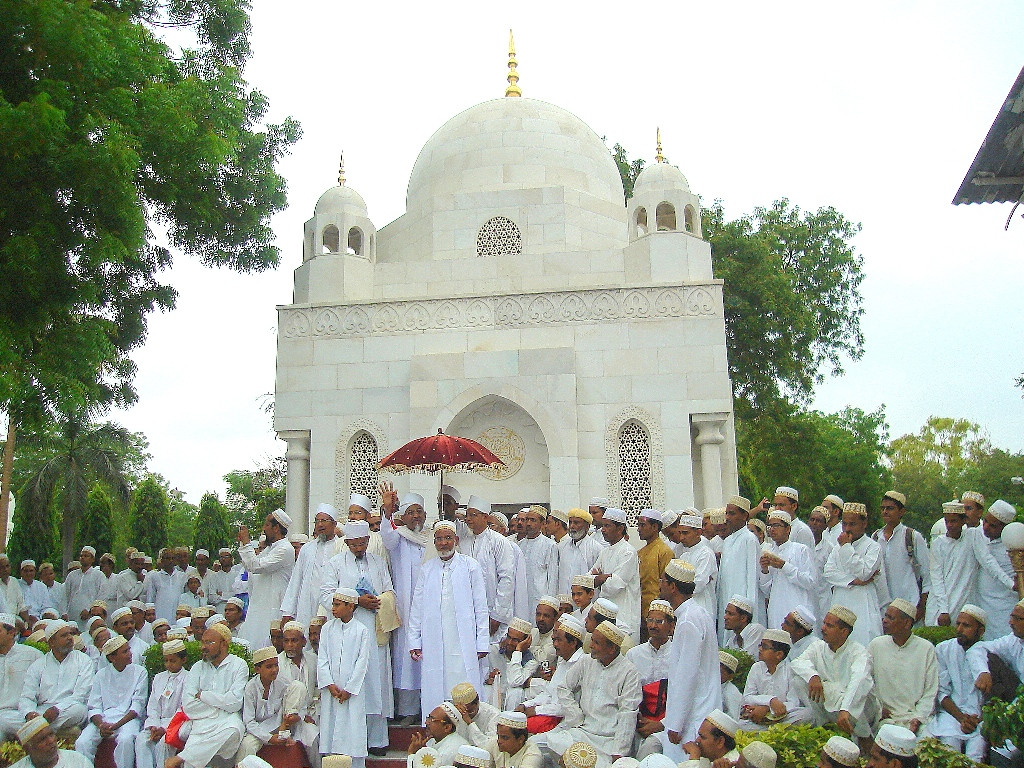
On 29–6–2009, the day when 29th Da'i Saiyedna Ali saheb became Da'i al-Mutlaq before 400 years, Alavi Bohras gathered in large numbers near Saiyedna Ali's tomb in Ahmedabad and 45th Da'i addressing the gathering

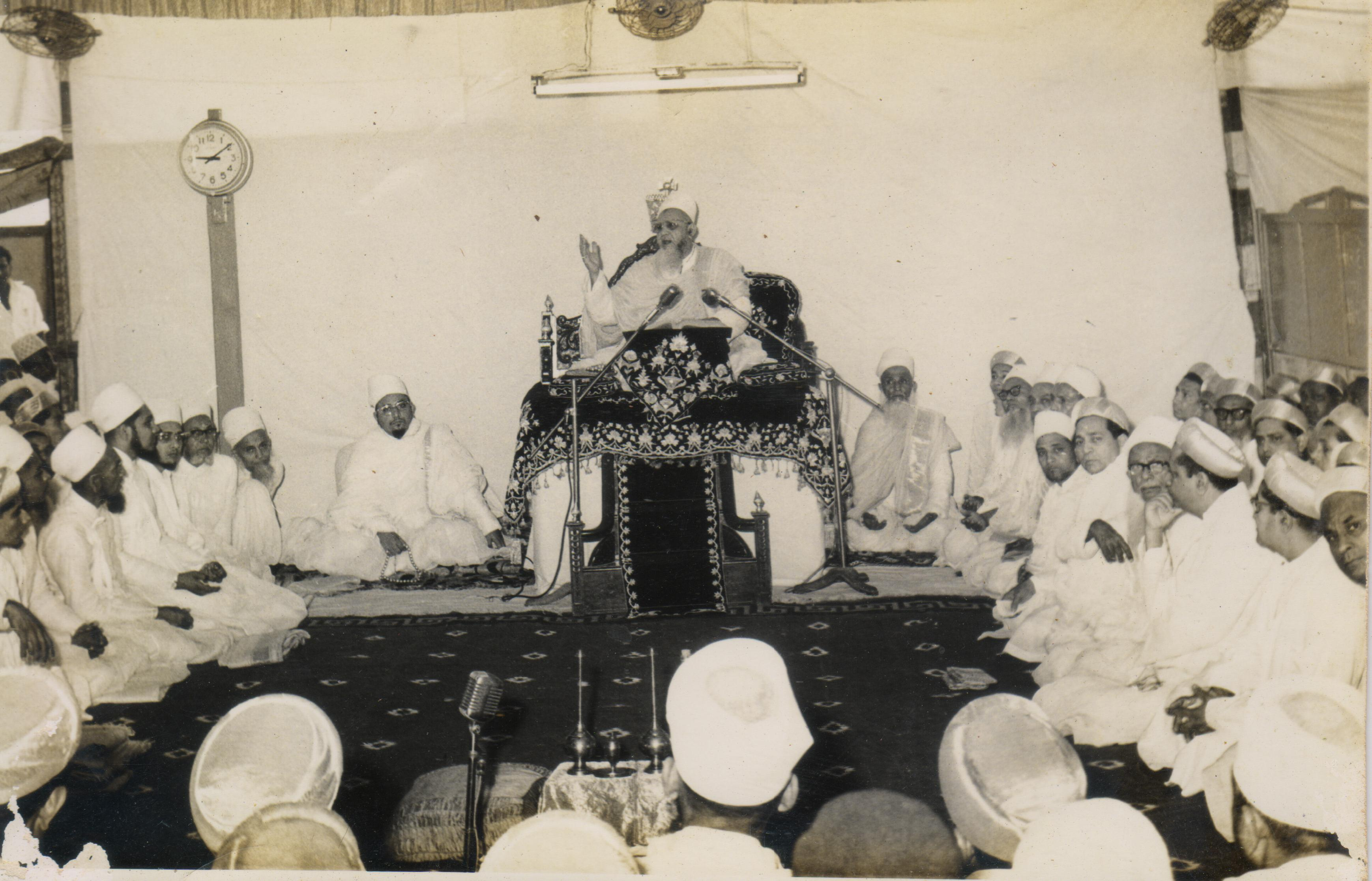
43rd Da'i al-Mutlaq Saiyedna Yusuf Nuruddin saheb delivering Moharram lecture in Vadodara - 5 Apr 1968

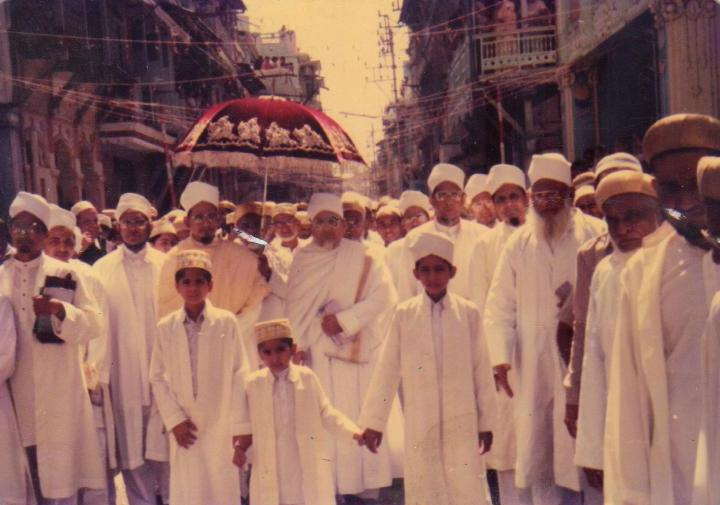
Procession of 44th Da'i Saiyedna T Ziyauddin saheb during his birthday celebration on 25 Nov 1987

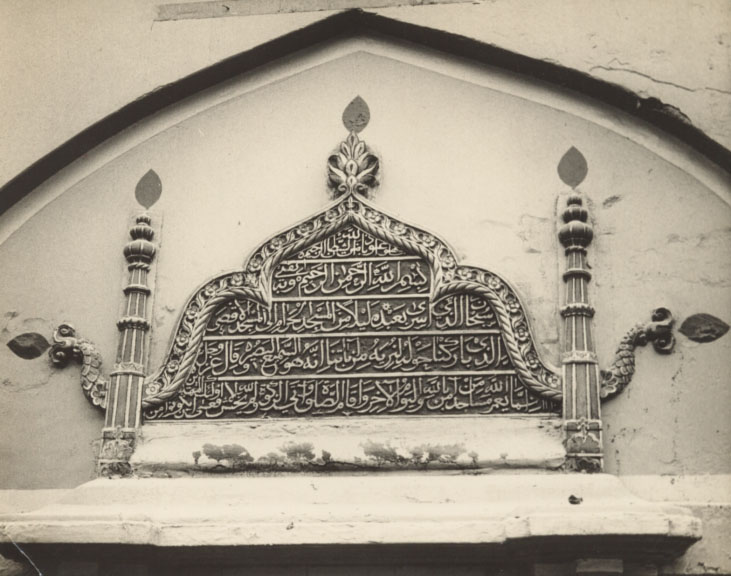
Middle Mehraab of Masjid e Ziyaai having Qur'anic inscriptions constructed by 32nd Da'i Saiyedna Jivabhai Ziyauddin saheb in 1110 AH/1699 AD in Badri Mohalla

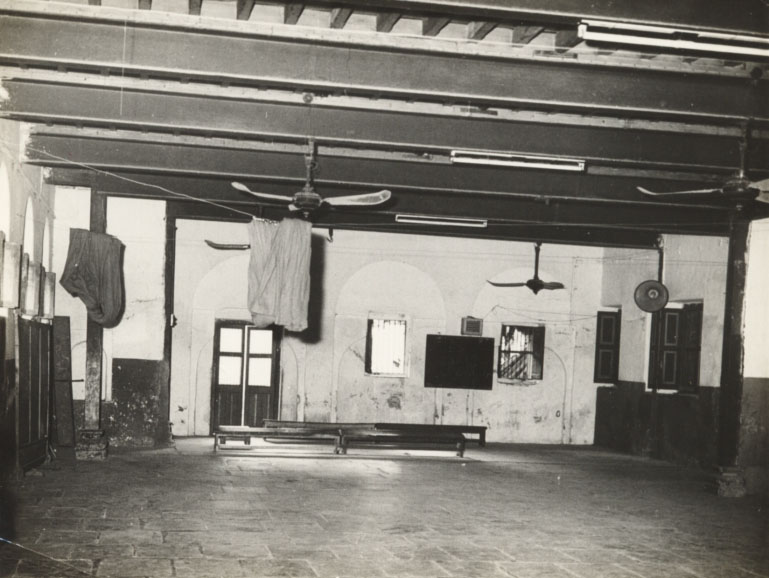
Mukaasir Saiyedi Nazarali Bhaisaheb used to teach his pupils besides Masjid e Ziyaai in Badri Mohalla that proved to be the cradle of learning - 1381 AH/1961 AD

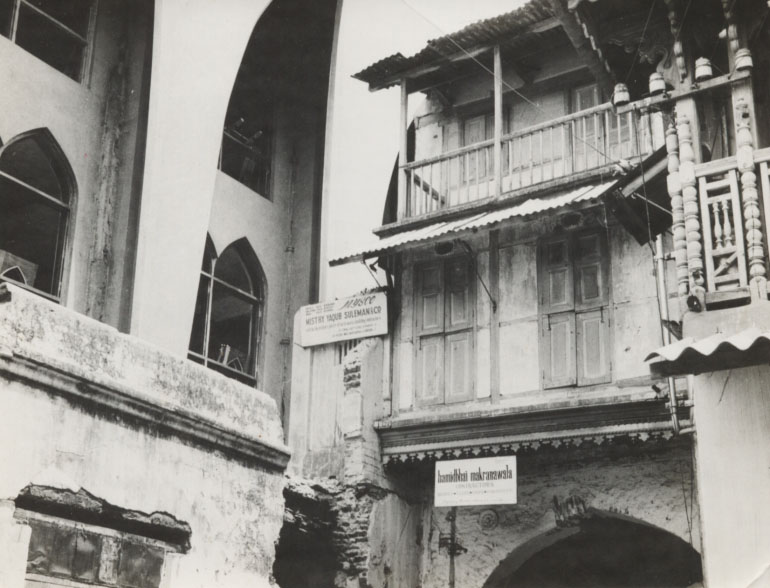
An Iconic gate called "Darwaza" of Badri Mohalla which was demolished to give a way for the construction of new mosque - 1389 AH/1969 AD

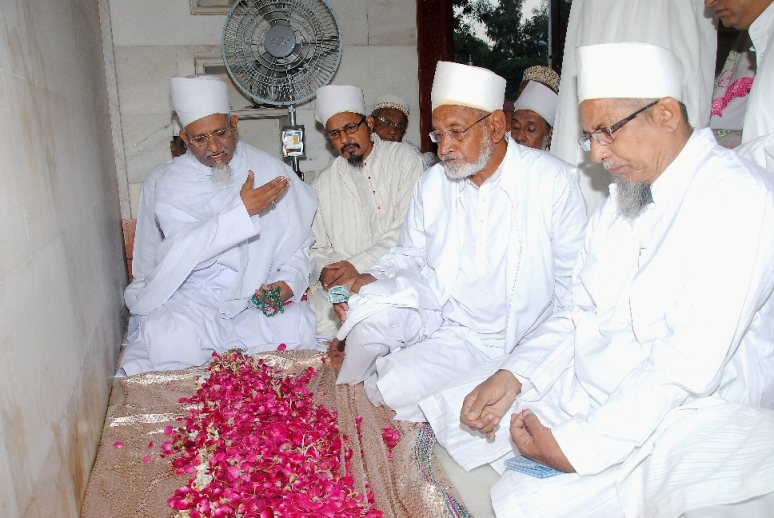
The place covered with flowers is the flattened grave of 29th 'Alavi Da'i Saiyedna 'Ali saheb - 1435 AH/2014 AD

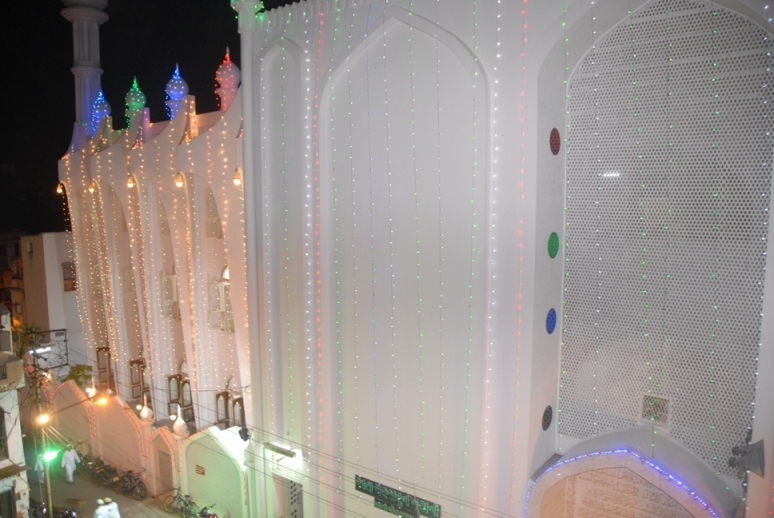
The outer view of Nooraani Masjid in Badri Mohalla - 1430 AH/2009 AD

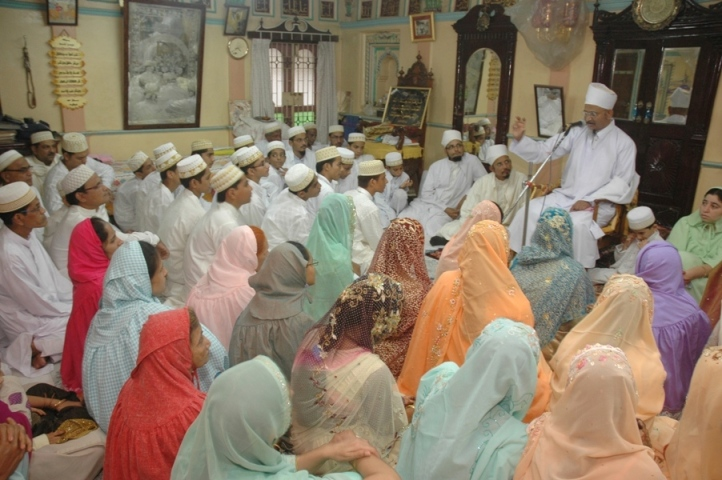
At the age of puberty, to become an Alavi Bohra, boys-girls offering oath of loyalty to Saiyedna saheb at his residence - 1430 AH/2009 AD

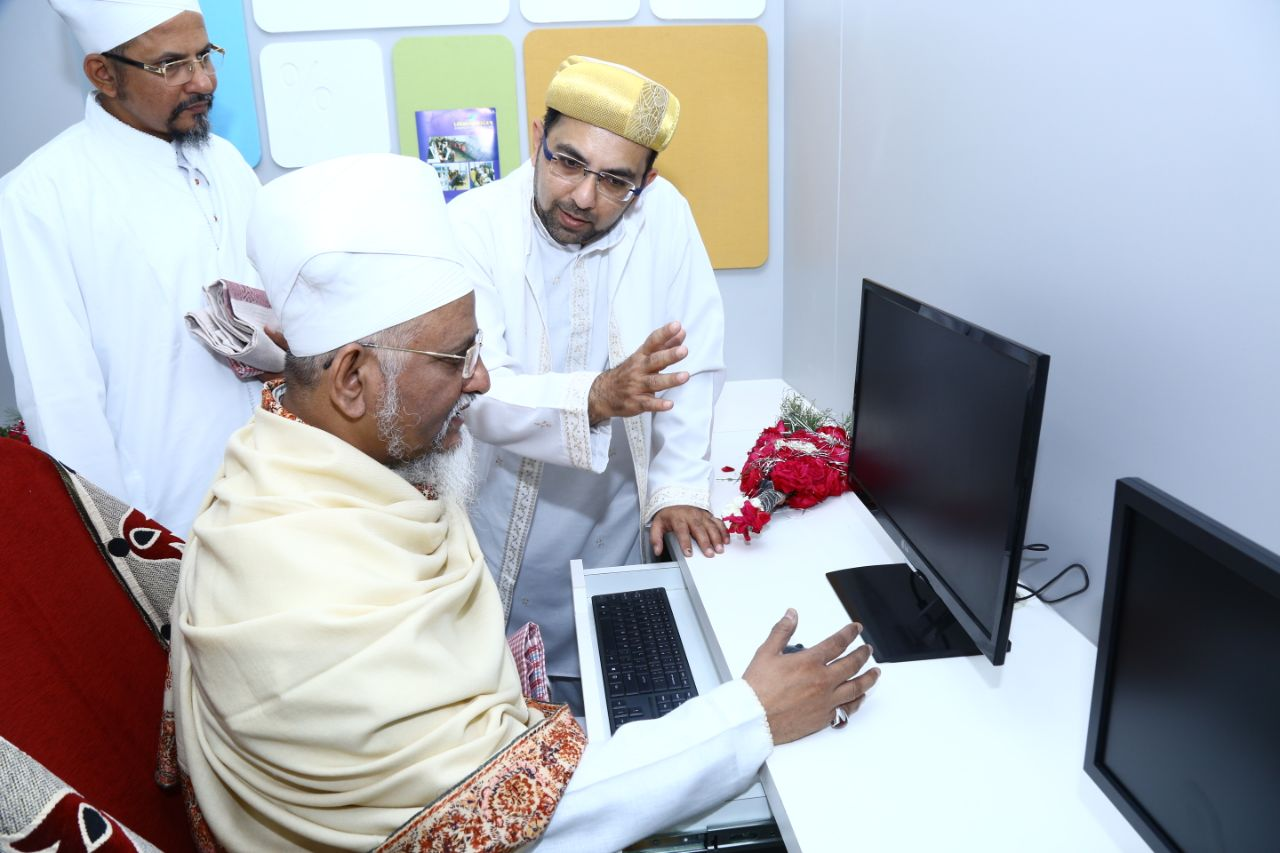
Saiyedna saheb operating a computer after inaugurating a Computer Class and always of the opinion to learn it at the earliest - 4–2–2018
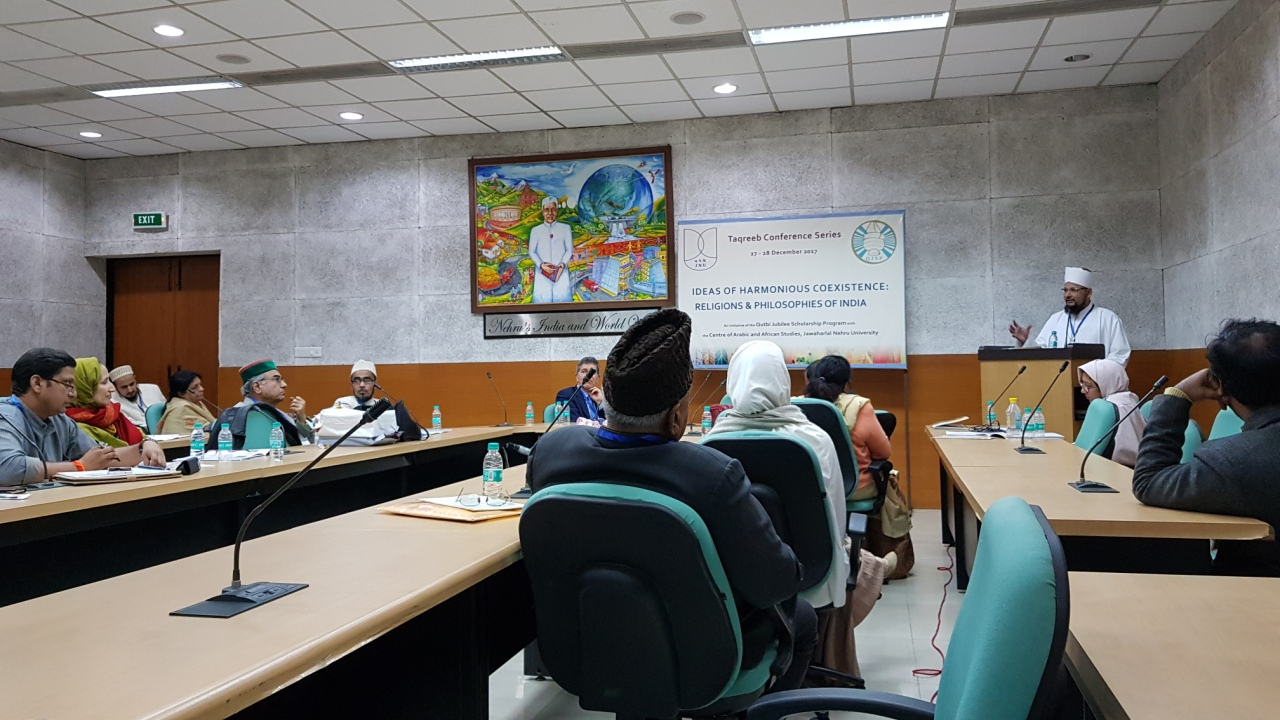
The representatives of Alavi Da'wat participated in the seminar organized by QJSP-Qutbi Jubilee Scholarship Program under the title "Ideas of Harmonious Coexistence - Religions and Philosophies of India" in New Delhi - 27–12–2017

== See also ==
- Atba-i-Malak
  - Atba-e-Malak Badar
  - Atba-i-Malak Vakil
- Dawoodi Bohra
  - Progressive Dawoodi Bohra
  - Succession to 52nd Dai al-Mutlaq
- Hebtiahs Bohra
- Sulaymani Bohra
- Sunni Bohra
