= List of Dai of the Dawoodi Bohra =

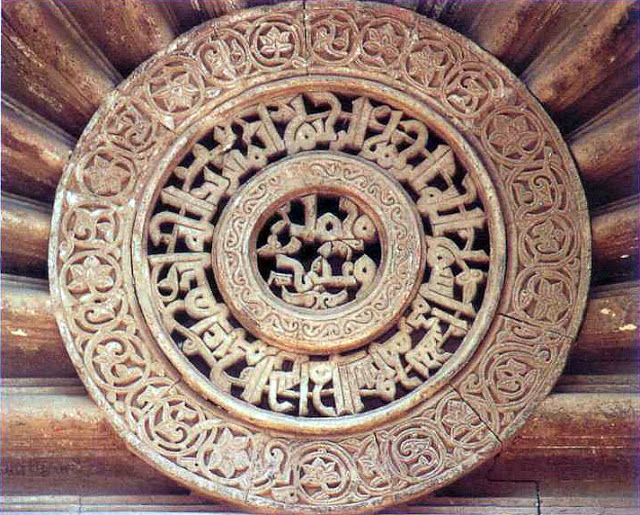
Qur'anic verse 33:33 inscribed at Al-Aqmar Mosque signifying the purity of Ahl al-Bayt [and their Du'at].

This is a list of Dai of the Dawoodi Bohra. The Dawoodi Bohra are a sect of Shia Islam, whose leader is the Da'i al-Mutlaq.

According to Ismaili, Fatimid, Mustali,(Taiyabi) tradition, after the death of Imām Al-Amir, al-Malika al-Sayyida (Hurratul-Malika) instituted the Da'i al-Mutlaq to run the da'wah from Yemen in the name of Imām Taiyab abi al-Qasim. This article gives short history and the list of the Dawoodi Bohra Dā'īs, their Mawazeen/Mukasir (associates) and The Walī-ul-Hind (Indian Walīs) ("representatives" or "caretakers" when the Dais were seated at Yemen).

Tayyibi Isma'ilism (Arabic: الطيبية, romanized: al-Ṭayyibiyya) is the only surviving sect of the Musta'li branch of Isma'ilism, the other being the extinct Hafizi branch. Followers of Tayyibi Isma'ilism are found in various Bohra communities: Dawoodi, Sulaymani, and Alavi.

The Tayyibi originally split from the Fatimid Caliphate-supporting Hafizi branch by supporting the right of Abu'l-Qasim al-Tayyib to the Imamate. See Musta'li Ismailism and Tayyibi Isma'ilism for further information.

== Short history ==
Upon the death of the twentieth Imam, al-Amir bi-Ahkam Allah (died 524 AH (1129/1130 CE)), his new born child Abu'l-Qasim al-Tayyib (born 524 AH (1129/1130 CE)) was appointed the twenty-first Imam. As he was not in a position to run the Dawah, the Queen Arwa al-Sulayhi, his Hujjah or proof, established the office of the Da'i al-Mutlaq, who acted on his behalf. The Da'i al-Mutlaq had now been given absolute authority and made independent from political activity.

=== Da'i al-Mutlaq Dhu'ayb ibn Musa ===
Da'i al-Mutlaq Zoeb bin Moosa used to live in and died in Huth, Yemen. His ma'zoon ("associate") was Khattab bin Hasan. After the death of Abdullah, Zoeb bin Moosa appointed Yaqub as the wali ("representative" or "caretaker") of the Tayyibi organisation ("dawah") in India. Yaqub was the first person of Indian origin to receive this honor. He was the son of Bharmal, minister of the Chaulukya king Jayasimha Siddharaja. Fakhruddin, son of Tarmal also another minister, was sent to western Rajasthan. One Da'i al mutlaq after another continued until the twenty-fourth Da'i al mutlaq, Yusuf Najmuddin ibn Sulaiman, in Yemen. Due to persecution by the local Zaidi ruler, the dawah then shifted to India under the twenty-fifth Da'i al mutlaq, Syedna Jalal Shamsuddin bin Hasan in 1567.

=== Sulaymani-Dawoodi-Alavi split ===
In 1592, the Tayyibi broke into two factions in a dispute over who should become the twenty-seventh Da'i al mutlaq: Dawood Bin Qutubshah or Sulayman bin Hassan. The followers of the former, primarily in India, became the Dawoodi Bohra, the latter the Sulaymani of Yemen. In 1621, the Alavi Bohra split from the Dawoodi Bohra community.

There is also a community of Sunni Bohra in India. In the fifteenth century, there was a schism in the Bohra community of Patan in Gujarat as a large number converted from Mustaali Ismaili Shia Islam to mainstream Hanafi Sunni Islam. The leader of this conversion movement to Sunni was Syed Jafar Ahmad Shirazi who also had the support of the governor of Gujarat. Thus this new group is known as Jafari Bohras, Patani Bohras or Sunni Bohra. Syed Jafar Ahmad Shirazi convinced the Patani Bohras to cease social relations with Ismaili Bohras. The cumulative results of these pressures resulted in a large number of Bohras converting from Shia Ismaili fiqh to Sunni Hanafi fiqh.

The Hebtiahs Bohra was a branch of Mustaali Ismaili Shi'a Islam that broke off from the mainstream Dawoodi Bohra after the death of the 39th Da'i al-Mutlaq in 1754. The Atba-e-Malak community are a branch of Mustaali Ismaili Shi'a Islam that broke off from the mainstream Dawoodi Bohra after the death of the 46th Da'i al-Mutlaq, under the leadership of Abdul Hussain Jivaji in 1840. They have further split into two more branches, the Atba-e-Malak Badar and Atba-e-Malak Vakil. The Progressive Dawoodi Bohra is a reformist sect within Mustaali Ismai'li Shi'a Islam that broke off circa 1977. They disagree with mainstream Dawoodi Bohra, as led by the Da'i al-Mutlaq, on doctrinal, economic and social issues.

At present, the largest Tayyibi faction/sub-sect is the Dawoodi Bohra, whose current leader is Syedna Mufaddal Saifuddin. Taher Fakhruddin is also a claimant to the title of Dai al Mutlaq since 2016, although it is widely accepted that Syedna Mufaddal Saifuddin is the leader of the Dawoodi Bohras, in all aspects and administration.

== History ==
=== The Dā'īs ===
Al-Malika al-Sayyida (Hurratul-Malika) was instructed and prepared by Imām Mustansir and following Imāms for the second period of satr. It was going to be on her hands that Imām Taiyab abi al-Qasim would go into seclusion, and she would institute the office of Dā'ĩ al-Mutlaq.

After breaking with the Fatimid teaching hierarchy, the Tayyibiyah in the Yemen recognized the Sulayhid queen as the hujjah of the concealed imam Al-Tayyib; with her backing they set up an independent teaching hierarchy headed by a dai mutlaq (“unrestricted summoner”) whose spiritual authority since her death in 1138 has been supreme. The second dai mutlaq, Ibrahim Al-Hamidi (1151–1162), became the real founder of the tayyibi esoteric doctrine, which he elaborated especially in his Kitab kanz Al-walad (Book of the child’s treasure). The position remained in his family until 1209, when it passed to Ali ibn Muhammad of the Banu Al-Walid Al-Anf family, which held it for more than three centuries with only two interruptions. The political power of the Yemenite daees reached a peak during the long incumbency of Idris Imad Al-Din ibn Al-Hasan, the nineteenth daee mutlaq (1428–1468). He is also the author of a seven-volume history of the Ismaili imams, Kitab uyun Al-akhbar (Book of choice stories) and of a two-volume history of the Yemenite daees, Kitab nuzhat Al-akhbar (Book of story and entertainment), as well as works of esoteric doctrine and religious controversy. While the Yemenite daees had been able to act relatively freely with the backing or protection of various rulers during the early centuries, they usually faced hostility from the Zaydi imams and in the sixteenth century suffered relentless persecution. In 1539 the twenty-third daee mutlaq appointed an Indian, Yusuf ibn Sulayman, as his successor, evidently in recognition of the growing importance of the Indian tayyii community. Yusuf came to reside in the Yemen, but after his death in 1566 his successor, also Indian, transferred the headquarters to Gujarat in India.

The Tayyibiyah preserved a large portion of the Fatimid religious literature and generally maintained the traditions of Fatimid doctrine more closely than the Nizariyah. Thus the Tayyibi daees always insisted on the equal importance of the z ahir and batin aspects of religion, strict compliance with the religious law and esoteric teaching. Qadi Al-Numan’s Da' a'im Al-Islam has remained the authoritative codex of Tayyibi law and ritual to the present. In the esoteric doctrine, however, there were some innovations which gave the Tayyibi gnosis its distinctive character. The Rasa'il Ikhwan Al-Safa'were accepted as the work of one of the pre-Fatimid hidden imams and were frequently quoted and interpreted.

The cosmological system of Al-Kirmani with its ten higher Intellects replaced that of Al-Nasafi predominant in the Fatimid age. Ibrahim Al-Hamidi changed its abstract rational nature by introducing a myth that Henry Corbin has called the Ismaili “drama in heaven.” According to it, the Second and Third Intellects emanating from the First Intellect became rivals for the second rank. When the Second Intellect attained his rightful position by his superior effort, the Third Intellect failed to recognize his precedence; in punishment for his haughty insubordination he fell from the third rank behind the remaining seven Intellects and, after repenting, became stabilized as the Tenth Intellect and demiurge (mudabbir). The lower world was produced out of the spiritual forms (suwar) that had also refused to recognize the superior rank of the Second Intellect, and out of the darkness generated by this sin. The Tenth Intellect, who is also called the spiritual Adam, strives to regain his original rank by summoning the fallen spiritual forms to repentance.

The first representative of his summons (da'wah) on earth was the first and universal Adam, the owner of the body of the world of origination (sahib Al-juththah Al-ibdaeeyah), or higher spiritual world. He is distinguished from the partial Adam who opened the present age of concealment (satr), in which the truth is hidden under the exterior of the prophetic messages and laws. After his passing the first Adam rose to the horizon of the Tenth Intellect and took his place, while the Tenth Intellect rose in rank. Likewise after the passing of the Qaim of each prophetic cycle, that being rises and takes the place of the Tenth Intellect, who thus gradually reaches the Second Intellect.

Countless cycles of manifestation (kashf) and concealment alternate in succession until the great resurrection (qiyamat Al-qiyamat) that consummates the megacycle (alkawr Al-azam) lasting 360,000 times 360,000 years. The soul of every believer is joined on the initiation to the esoteric truth by a point of light; this is the believer’s spiritual soul, which grows as the believer advances in knowledge. After physical death the light rises to join the soul of the holder of the rank (hadd) above the believer in the hierarchy. Jointly they continue to rise until the souls of all the faithful are gathered in the light temple (haykal nurani) in the shape of a human being which constitutes the form of the Qaim (surah qa'imiyah) of the cycle, which then rises to the horizon of the Tenth Intellect. The souls of the unbelievers remain joined to their bodies, which are dissolved into inorganic matter and further transformed into descending orders of harmful creatures and substances. Depending on the gravity of their sins they may eventually rise again through ascending forms of life and as human beings may accept the summons to repentance or end up in torment lasting the duration of the megacycle.

The Tayyibiyah in India are commonly known as the Bohras. There are, however, also Sunni and some Hindu Bohras; they are mostly engaged in agriculture, while the Ismaili Bohras are generally merchants. The origins of the Tayyibi community in Gujarat go back to the time before the Tayyibi schism. According to the traditional account an Arab daee sent from the Yemen arrived in the region of Cambay with two Indian assistants in 1068. The Ismaili community founded by him, though led by local walis, always maintained close commercial as well as religious ties with the Yemen and was controlled by the Yemenite teaching hierarchy. It naturally followed the Yemenite community at the time of the schism. From Cambay the community spread to other cities, in particular Patan, Sidhpur, and Ahmadabad. In the first half of the fifteenth century the Ismailiyyah were repeatedly exposed to persecution by the Sunni sultans of Gujarat, and after a contested succession to the leadership of the Bohora community, a large section, known as the Jafariyah, seceded and converted to Sunnism.

After its transfer from the Yemen in 1566, the residence of the daee mutlaq remained in India. The succession to the twenty-sixth daee mutlaq, Daud ibn Ajabshah (died 1591), was disputed. In India Daud Burhan Al-Din ibn Qut bshah was recognized by the great majority as the twenty-seventh daee mutlaq. However, Daud ibn Ajabshah’s deputy in the Yemen, Sulayman ibn Hasan, a grandson of the first Indian daee mutlaq Yusuf ibn Sulayman, also claimed to have been the designated successor and after a few years he came to India to press his case. Although he found little support, the dispute was not resolved and resulted in the permanent split of the Daudi and Sulaymani factions recognizing separate lines of daees.

The leadership of the Sulaymaniyah, whose Indian community was small, reverted back to the Yemen with the succession of the thirtieth daee mutlaq, Ibrahim ibn Muhammad ibn Fahd Al-Makrami, in 1677. Since then the position of daee mutlaq has remained in various branches of the Makrami family except for the time of the forty-sixth daee, an Indian. The Makrami daees usually resided in Badr in Najran. With the backing of the tribe of the Banu Yam they ruled Najran independently and at times extended their sway over other parts of the Yemen and Arabia until the incorporation of Najran into Saudi Arabia in 1934. The peak of their power was in the time of the thirty-third daee mutlaq, Ismail ibn Hibat Allah (1747–1770), who defeated the Wahhabiyah in Najd and invaded hadramawt. He is also known as the author of an esoteric Qur'an commentary, virtually the only religious work of a Sulaymani author published so far. Since Najran came under Saudi rule, the religious activity of the daees and their followers has been severely restricted. In the Yemen the Sulaymaniyah are found chiefly in the region of Manakha and the haraz mountains. In India they live mainly in Baroda, Ahmadabad, and Hyderabad and are guided by a representative (mansub) of the daee mutlaq residing in Baroda.

The daees of the Daudiyah, who constitute the great majority of the Tayyibiyah in India, have continued to reside there. All of them have been Indians except the thirtieth daee mutlaq, Ali Shams Al-Din (1621–1631), a descendant of the Yemenite daee Idris EImad Al-Din. The community was generally allowed to develop freely although there was another wave of persecution under the emperor Awrangzib (1635–1707), who put the thirty-second daee mutlaq, Qutb Al-Din ibn Daud, to death in 1646 and imprisoned his successor. The residence of the Daudi daee mutlaq is now in Bombay, where the largest concentration of Bohoras is found. Outside Gujarat, Daudi Bohoras live in Maharashtra, Rajasthan, in many of the big cities of India, Pakistan, Sri Lanka, and Burma, and the East Africa. In the Yemen the Daudi community is concentrated in the Haraz mountains.

After the death of the twenty-eighth dai mutlaq, Adam Safi Al-Din, in 1621, a small faction recognized his grandson Ali ibn Ibrahim as his successor and seceded from the majority recognizing Abd Al-Tayyib Zaki Al-Din. The minority became known as Alia Bohras and have followed a separate line of dais residing in Baroda. Holding that the era of the prophet Muhammad had come to an end, a group of Alias seceded in 1204/1789. Because of their abstention from eating meat they are called Nagoshias (not meat eaters). In 1761 a distinguished Daudi scholar, Hibat Allah ibn Ismail, claimed that he was in contact with the hidden imam, who had appointed him his hujjah and thus made his rank superior to that of dai mutlaq. He and his followers, known as Hibtias, were excommunicated and persecuted by the Daudiyah. Since the turn of the century a Bohra reform movement has been active. While recognizing the spiritual authority of the dai mutlaq it has sought through court action to restrict his powers of excommunication and his absolute control over community endowments and alms. All of these groups are numerically insignificant.

Syedna Zoeb bin Moosa was first to be instituted to this office, and the line of Taiyabi Dā'ĩs that began in 1132. The second da'i mutlaq, Ibrahim Al-Hamidi (1151–1162), became the real founder of the tayyibi esoteric doctrine, which he elaborated especially in his Kitab kanz Al-walad (Book of the child's treasure). The position remained in his family until 1209, when it passed to Ali ibn Muhammad of the Banu Al-Walid Al-Anf family, which held it for more than three centuries with only two interruptions. The political power of the Yemenite da'is reached a peak during the long incumbency of Idris Imad Al-Din ibn Al-Hasan, the nineteenth da'i mutlaq (1428–1468). He is also the author of a seven-volume history of the Ismaili imams, Kitab uyun Al-akhbar (Book of choice stories) and of a two-volume history of the Yemenite da'is, Kitab nuzhat Al-akhbar (Book of story and entertainment), as well as works of esoteric doctrine and religious controversy.

While the Yemenite da'is had been able to act relatively freely with the backing or protection of various rulers during the early centuries, they usually faced hostility from the Zaydi imams and in the sixteenth century suffered relentless persecution. Until the 23rd Dā'ī, the center of the dawat was in Yemen. In 1539 the twenty-third da'i mutlaq appointed an Indian, Yusuf ibn Sulayman, as his successor, evidently in recognition of the growing importance of the Indian tayyibi community. Yusuf came to reside in the Yemen, he died and was buried there.

Because of the intense persecutions against the dawat by the Zaydi rulers of Yemen, the 24th Dā'ī Yusuf designated Jalal Shamshuddin in India as his successor, and the center of the dawat then moved permanently to India. The 25th Dā'ī also died in 1567 CE, and is buried in Ahmedabad, India, the first Dā'ī to have his mausoleum in India.

After the death of Da'ud b. 'Adjabshah, the 26th da'imutlaq, in 999/1591, the succession was disputed. While in India Da'ud Burhan al-Din was established, his followers were called Dawoodi Bohra there after. The Dawoodi da'is continued to reside in India, where the great majority of their followers live. The da'wa generally was able to develop freely. Their present Dai is 53rd and his residence is now in Bombay. The largest concentration of Bohras is found in Gujarat. Outside Gujarat, Daudi Bohoras live in Maharashtra, Rajasthan, Madhya pradesh state and, in many of the big cities of India, Pakistan, Sri Lanka, and Burma, and the East Africa. In the Yemen the Daudi community is concentrated in the Haraz mountains

=== The Walī-ul-Hind ===
Up to the 23rd Dā'ī, the da'wah center was at Yemen; for India, a "Walī al-Hind" (representative/caretaker for India) was designated by the Dā'ī to run the dawat in India.

The Wali- ul -Hind were champions of the Fatimid dawat in India, who were instrumental in maintaining & propagating it on instructions of the Dā'ī at Yemen, and it is because of them that the Fatimid dawat was able to survive the persecutions in Cairo and Yemen.

Moulai Abadullah was the first Walī al-Hind in the era of Imam Mustansir (427–487 AH). Abadullah (originally named Baalam Nath) and Syedi Nuruddin (originally named Roop Nath) went to Cairo, Egypt, to learn, and went to India in 467 AH. Moulai Ahmed was also their companion.

First Dā'ī Zoeb appointed Maulai Yaqoob (after the death of Abadullah), who was the second Walī al-Hind of the Fatimid dawat. Moulai Yaqoob was the first person of Indian origin to receive this honour under the Dā'ī. He was son of Moulai Bharmal, minister of Hindu Solanki King Siddhraja Jaya Singha (Anhalwara, Patan) (487–527 AH/1094–1133 CE). With Minister Moulai Tarmal, they had honoured the Fatimid dawat along with their fellow citizens on the call of Moulai Abdullah. Moulai Fakhruddin, son of Moulai Tarmal, was sent to western Rajasthan, India, and Syedi Nuruddin went to the Deccan (death: Jumadi al-Ula 11 at Don Gaum, Aurangabad, Maharashtra, India).

One Dā'ī after another continued until the 23rd Dā'ī in Yemen. Persons were appointed to the position of Walī al-Hind one after another in India. A list of them is also given below along with the relevant Dā'īs.

In the generation of Moulai Yaqoob, Moulai Ishaq, Moulai Ali, Moulai Hasan fir continued one after another as Wali-ul-Hind. Moulai Hasan Fir was fifth Wali in the era of 16th Dai Abadullah (died 809 AH/1406 AD) of Yemen.

Walī -ul-Hind Moulai Jafer, Moulai Abdul Wahab, and Moulai Qasim Khan bin Hasan (11th Walī al-Hind, and who died in 950 AH/1543 CE in Ahmedabad) were last three upto 23 rd Dai. Because of the intense persecutions against the dawat by the Zaydi rulers of Yemen, it was transferred to India from Yemen when the 23rd Dā'ī Syedna Mohammed Ezzuddin designated Syedna Yusuf Najmuddin ibn Sulaiman as his successor (and, thus the 24th Dā'ī) in Sidhpur, Gujarat, India. Yusuf went to reside in the Yemen, he died and was buried there. Before his death 24th Dā'ī Yusuf designated Jalal Shamshuddin as 25th Dai in India as his successor, who was also last Walī -ul-Hind under the 24th Dā'ī Yusuf for 20 years. The center of the dawat then moved permanently to India.

=== Photo gallery ===
Wali –ul-Hind

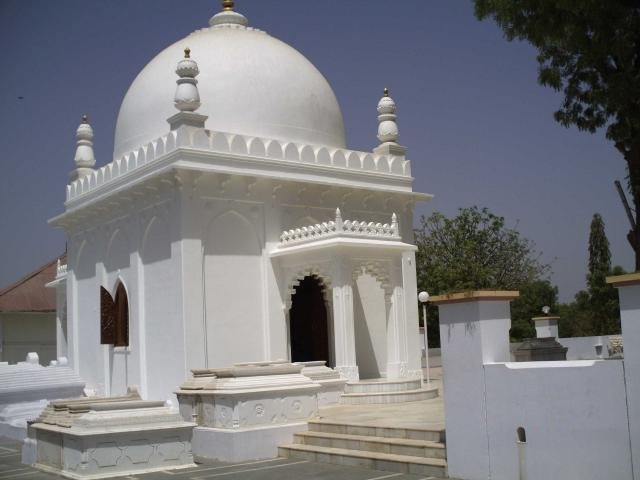
Roja Moulai Abadullah, Khambhat

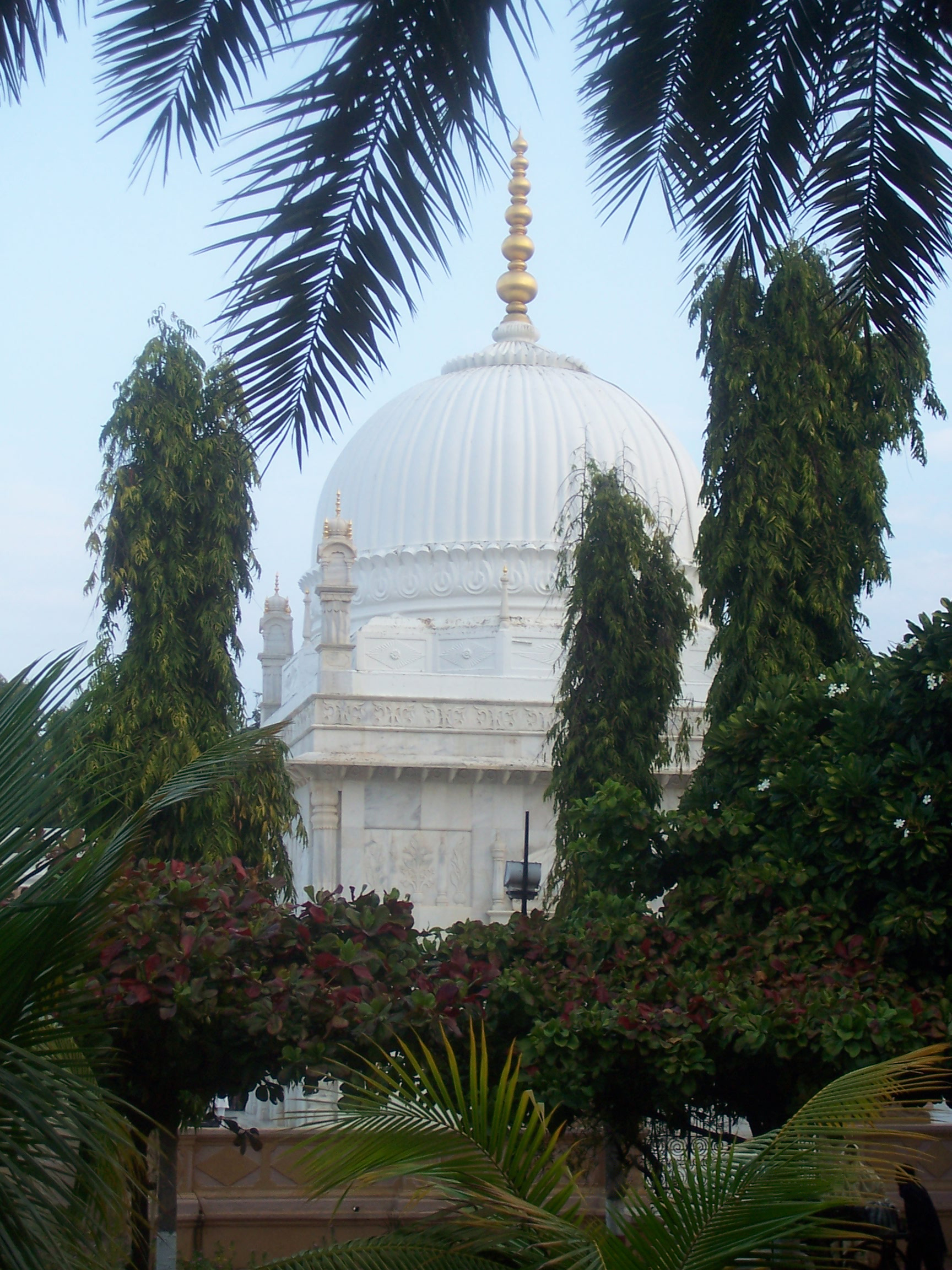
Hasan Pir Shaheed Mazar, Denmaal, gujrat

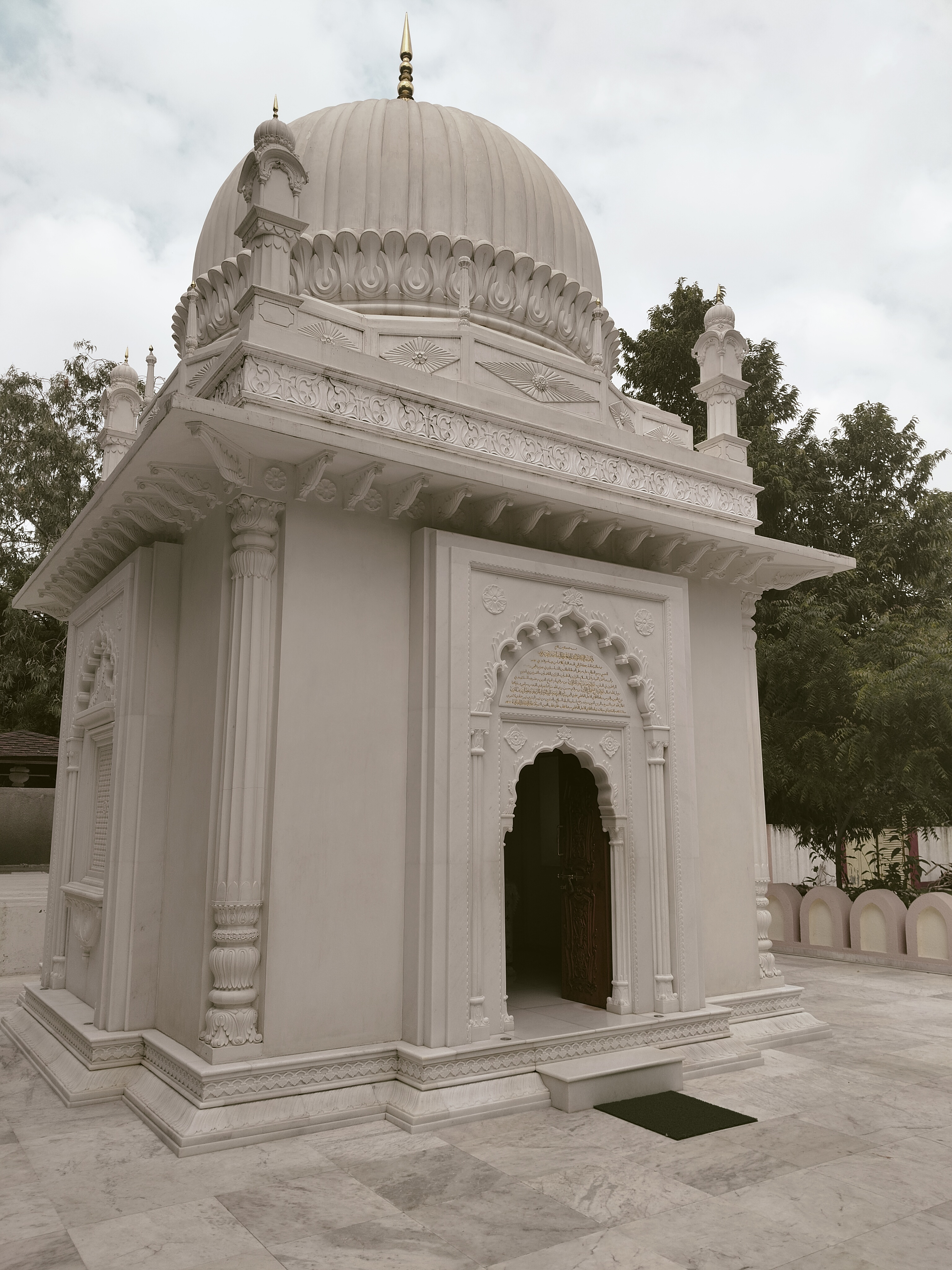
Roja Moulai Raj bin Hasan, Moulai hasan bin Moulai adam, Ahmedabad

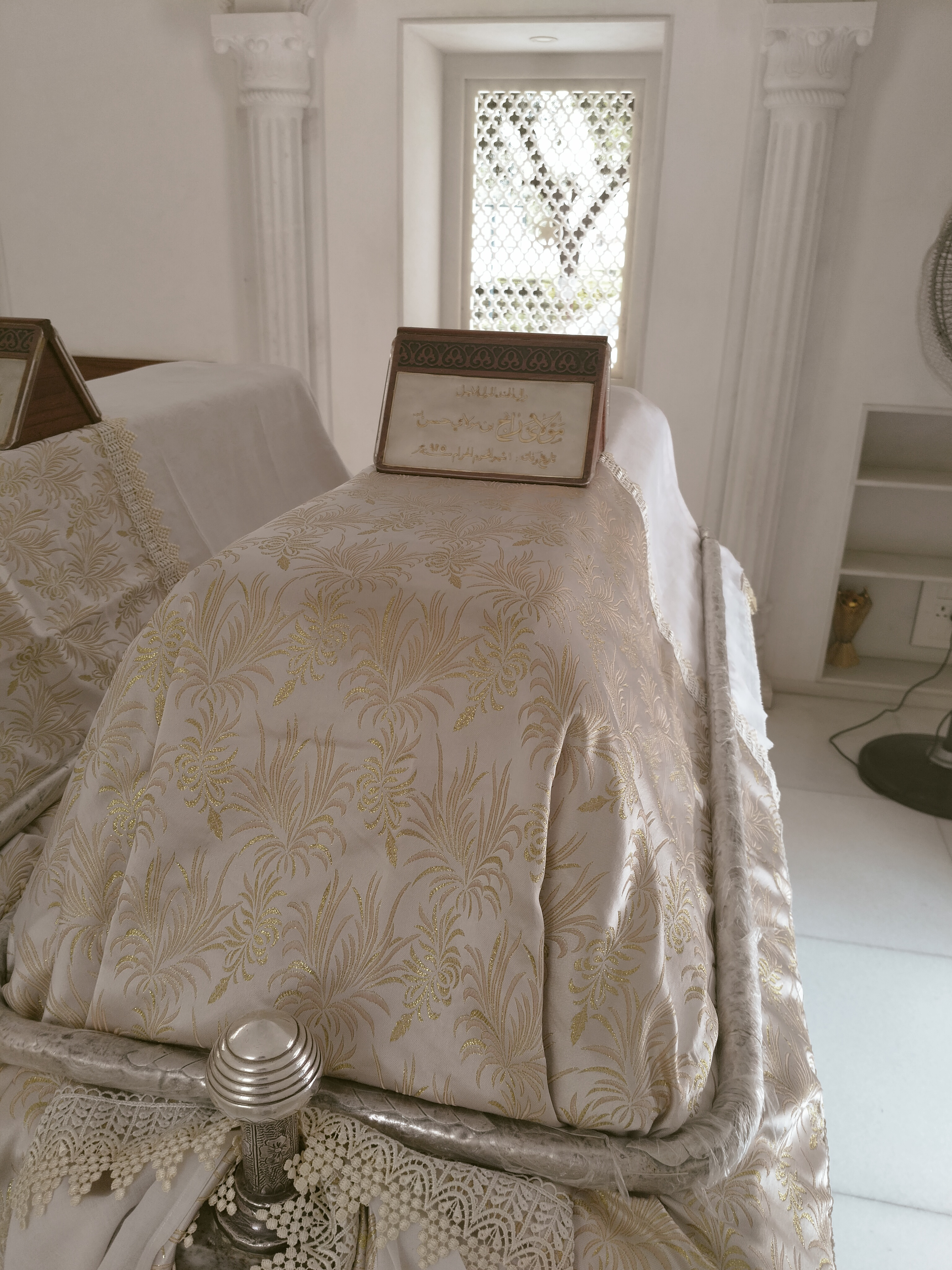
Grave Moulai Raj bin Moulai Hasan, Ahmedabad

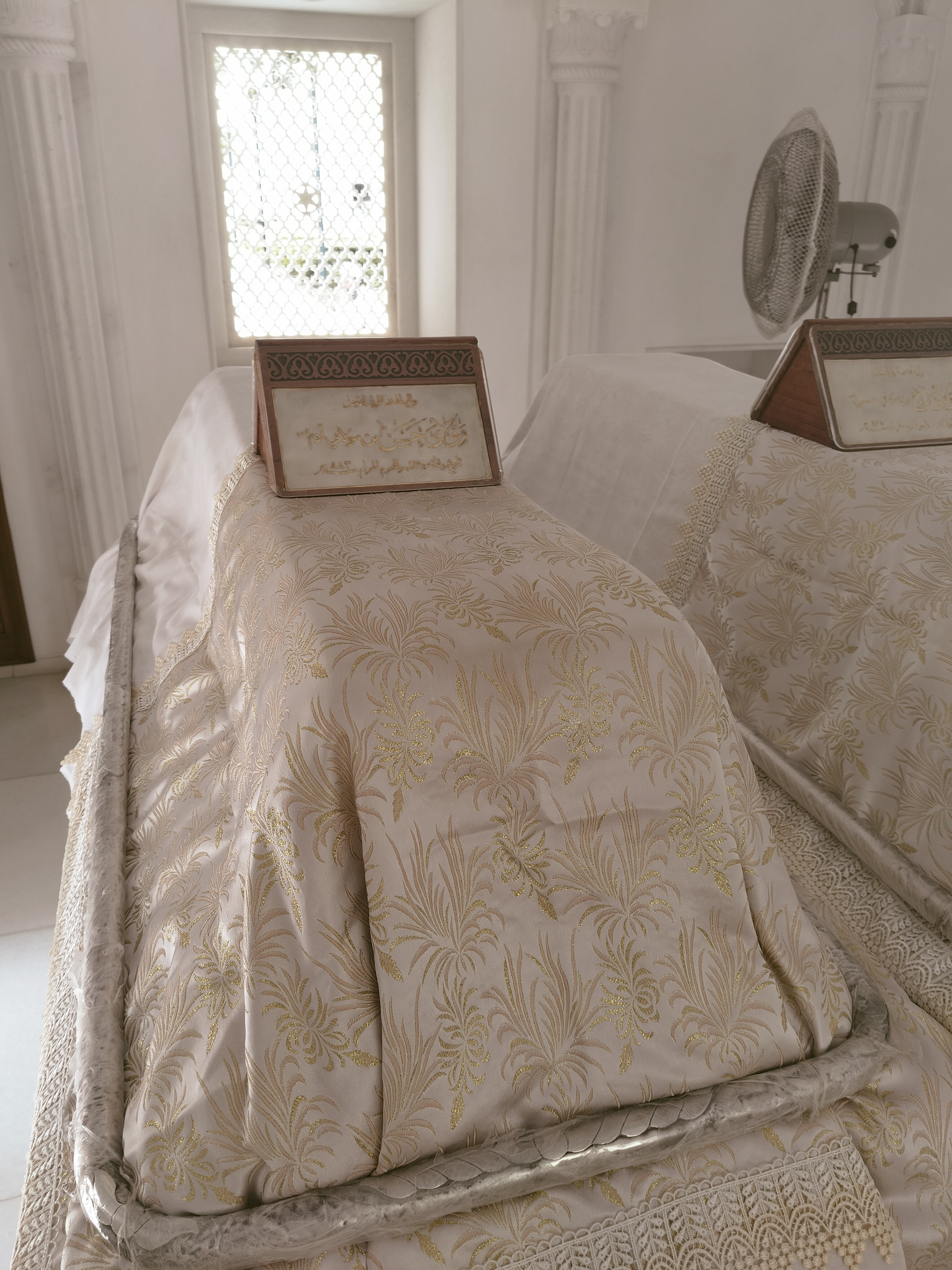
Grave Moulai Hasn bin Moulai adam, ahmedabad

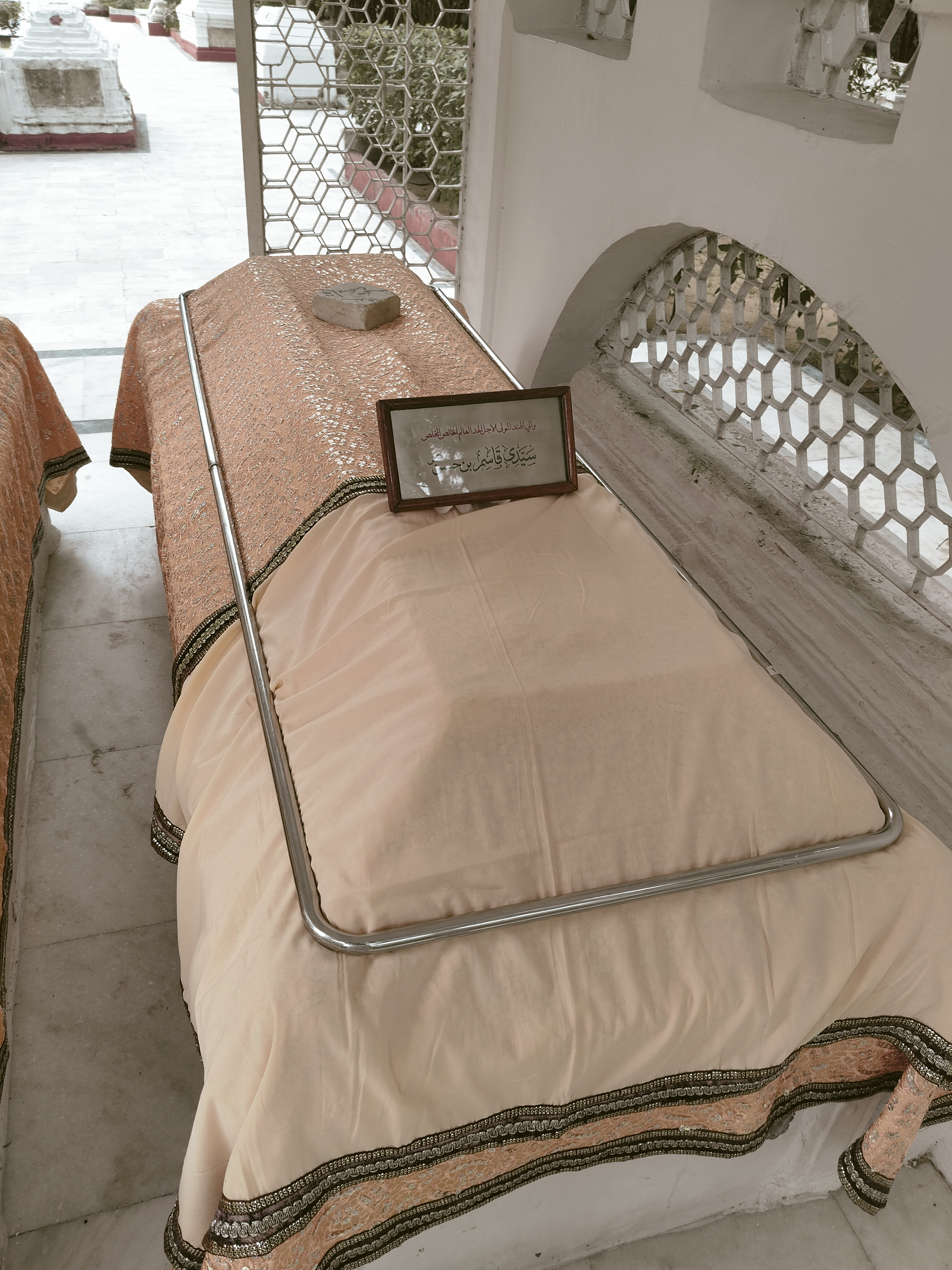
Grave Syedi Qasim bin Hasan, Ahmedabad

== List of Da'i al-Mutlaq of the Dawoodi Bohra ==
=== Dua't Yamaniyah (1138–1539 CE) ===
Dua't Mutlaqeen Seated in Yemen
No.	Name	Dai Period CE (AH)	Tenure	Resting Place	Seat of Administration	Mazoon al-Da'wat	Mukaasir al-Da'wat	Walī-ul-Hind	Notable Events & Figures
1	Zoeb bin Moosa al-Waade'ee ذويب بن موسى الوادي	1138 –1151 (530 – 546)	13 years, 4 months, 17 days	Huth (exact site unknown)	Huth	Syedna Khattaab bin Hasan (died 1138) Syedna Ibrahim bin Husain al-Haamedi		1. Moulai Abdullah; (died 1141) (Khambat, Gujarat)	
1	Zoeb bin Moosa al-Waade'ee ذويب بن موسى الوادي	1138 –1151 (530 – 546)	13 years, 4 months, 17 days	Huth (exact site unknown)	Huth	Syedna Khattaab bin Hasan (died 1138) Syedna Ibrahim bin Husain al-Haamedi		2. Moulai Yaqub bin Moulai Bharmal; (Patan, Gujarat.)	
2	Ibrahim bin Husain al-Haamedi ابراهيم بن حسين الحميدي	1151–1162 (546–557)	11 years, 7 months, 6 days	Ghayl bani-Haamid	Ghayl bani-Haamid (Outskirts of Sana'a)	Syedna Husain bin Ali al-Waleed (died 1159) Syedna Hatim bin Ibrahim al-Haamedi	Syedna Mohammad bin Taher Al Haresi	2. Moulai Yaqub bin Moulai Bharmal; (Patan, Gujarat.)	
3	Hatim Mohyi'uddin bin Ibrahim al-Haamedi حاتم بن ابراهيم الحميدي	1162–1199 (557–596)	38 years, 5 months	Al-Hutaib ul-Mubarak	Al-Hutaib ul-Mubarak	Syedna Mohammad bin Taher Al Haresi (died 1188) Syedna Ali bin Maula Mohammad bin il-Waleed		2. Moulai Yaqub bin Moulai Bharmal; (Patan, Gujarat.)	
4	Ali Shamsuddin bin Hatim al-Haamedi علي بن حاتم الحميدي	1199–1209 (596–605)	9 years, 10 months, 9 days	Sana'a (exact site unknown)	Sana'a	Syedna Ali bin Maula Mohammad bin il-Waleed		2. Moulai Yaqub bin Moulai Bharmal; (Patan, Gujarat.)	
5	Ali bin Maula Muhammad bin il-Waleed علي بن محمد الوليد	1209–1215 (605–612)	6 years, 9 months, 2 days	Al-Aghmur (Haraaz) (exact site unknown)	Sana'a	Syedna Ali bin Hanzala		2. Moulai Yaqub bin Moulai Bharmal; (Patan, Gujarat.)	
5	Ali bin Maula Muhammad bin il-Waleed علي بن محمد الوليد	1209–1215 (605–612)	6 years, 9 months, 2 days	Al-Aghmur (Haraaz) (exact site unknown)	Sana'a	Syedna Ali bin Hanzala		3. Moulai Ishaq bin Yaqub; (Patan, Gujarat)	
6	Ali bin Hanzala al-Waade'ee علي بن حنظلة الوادي	1215–1229 (612–626)	13 years, 6 months, 14 days	Hamdaan (exact site unknown)	Sana'a	Syedna Ahmed bin Mubaarak	Syedna Husain bin Ali bin Maula Muhammad bin il-Waleed	3. Moulai Ishaq bin Yaqub; (Patan, Gujarat)	
7	Ahmed bin Mubarak Al Walid احمد بن مبارك الوليد	1229–1230 (626–627)	1 year, 3 months, 16 days	Sana'a (exact site unknown)	Sana'a	Syedna Husain bin Ali bin Maula Muhammad bin il-Waleed	Syedi Ahmed bin Syedna Ali bin Hanzala	3. Moulai Ishaq bin Yaqub; (Patan, Gujarat)	
8	Husain bin Ali bin Maula Mohammed bin il-Waleed حسين بن علي صاحب الوليد	1230–1268 (627–667)	39 years, 7 months, 24 days	Sana'a (exact site unknown)	Sana'a	Syedi Ahmed bin Syedna Ali bin Hanzala (died 651 AH) Ali bin Husain	Syedi Mohammad bin As'ad bin Mubarak	3. Moulai Ishaq bin Yaqub; (Patan, Gujarat)	
8	Husain bin Ali bin Maula Mohammed bin il-Waleed حسين بن علي صاحب الوليد	1230–1268 (627–667)	39 years, 7 months, 24 days	Sana'a (exact site unknown)	Sana'a	Syedi Ahmed bin Syedna Ali bin Hanzala (died 651 AH) Ali bin Husain	Syedi Mohammad bin As'ad bin Mubarak	4. Moulai Ali bin Ishaq; (Patan, Gujarat.)	
9	Ali bin Husain علي بن حسين بن علي بن محمد	1268–1284 (667–682)	15 years, 8 months, 20 days	Sana'a (exact site unknown)	Sana'a	Syedi Husain bin Ali bin Hanzala (died 677 AH) Ali bin Syedi Husain bin Ali bin Hanzala	Sheikh Assad Hatim Sanjaani	4. Moulai Ali bin Ishaq; (Patan, Gujarat.)	
10	Ali bin Syedi Husain bin Ali bin Hanzala علي بن الحسين بن علي بن حنظلة	1284–1287 (682–686)	3 years, 2 months, 18 days	Sana'a (exact site unknown)	Sana'a	Ibrahim bin Husain		4. Moulai Ali bin Ishaq; (Patan, Gujarat.)	
11	Ibrahim bin Husain Al Walid ابراهيم بن حسين الوليد	1287–1328 (686–728)	42 years, 8 months, 9 days	Hisne-Af'eda, Hafat Idris, Sana'a Governorate	Hamdan	Syedna Mohammad bin Syedi Hatim		4. Moulai Ali bin Ishaq; (Patan, Gujarat.)	
11	Ibrahim bin Husain Al Walid ابراهيم بن حسين الوليد	1287–1328 (686–728)	42 years, 8 months, 9 days	Hisne-Af'eda, Hafat Idris, Sana'a Governorate	Hamdan	Syedna Mohammad bin Syedi Hatim		5. Syedi HasanFeer Shaheed bin Ali; (died 795 AH/1392 CE) (Denmal, Gujarat.)	
12	Mohammed bin Hatim bin Syedna Husain Al Walid محمد بن حاتم الوليد	1328–1329 (728–729)	1 year, 1 month, 21 days	Hisne-Af'eda, Hafat Idris, Sana'a Governorate	Hamdan	Syedna Ali bin Syedna Ibrahim		5. Syedi HasanFeer Shaheed bin Ali; (died 795 AH/1392 CE) (Denmal, Gujarat.)	
13	Ali Shamsuddin I bin Ibrahim علي شمس الدين بن ابراهيم	1329–1345 (729–746)	16 years, 7 months, 17 days	Hisne-Af'eda, Hafat Idris, Sana'a Governorate	Hamdan	Syedna Abdul-Muttalib Najmuddin		5. Syedi HasanFeer Shaheed bin Ali; (died 795 AH/1392 CE) (Denmal, Gujarat.)	
14	Abdul-Muttalib Najmuddin bin Mohammed عبد المطلب نجم الدين	1345–1354 (746–755)	8 years, 11 months, 26 days	Zimarmar Fort	Zimarmar	Syedna Abbas bin Muhammed		5. Syedi HasanFeer Shaheed bin Ali; (died 795 AH/1392 CE) (Denmal, Gujarat.)	
15	Abbas bin Muhammad عباس بن محمد	1354–1378 (755–779)	24 years, 2 months, 24 days	Hisne-Af'eda, Hafat Idris, Sana'a Governorate	Zimarmar	Abdullah Fakhruddin bin Ali		5. Syedi HasanFeer Shaheed bin Ali; (died 795 AH/1392 CE) (Denmal, Gujarat.)	
16	Abdullah Fakhruddin bin Ali bin Syedna Mohammed	1378–1407 (779–809)	29 years, 11 months, 1 day	Zimarmar Fort	Zimarmar	Syedi Ali bin Abdullah Shaibaani (died 788 AH) Syedi Husain (died 796H) Syedna Hasan Badruddin I	Syedi Abdul Muttalib bin Abdullah		
17	Hasan Badruddin I bin Abdullah Fakhruddin حسن بدر الدين بن عبد الله	1407–1418 (809–821)	12 years, 27 days	Zimarmar Fort	Zimarmar	Syedi Abdul Muttalib Najmuddin (died 811/1408) Syedi Mohammed bin Idris Asaduddin (d.821/1418)	Syedi Ahmed bin Syedna Abdullah	6. Maulaya Adam bin Sulaiman; (Kankariya, Ahmedabad)	
18	Ali Shamsuddin II bin Abdullah Fakhruddin علي شمس الدين بن عبد الله	1418–1428 (821–832)	10 years, 3 months, 27 days	Al Shariqa	Al Shariqa	Idris Imaduddin		6. Maulaya Adam bin Sulaiman; (Kankariya, Ahmedabad)	
18	Ali Shamsuddin II bin Abdullah Fakhruddin علي شمس الدين بن عبد الله	1418–1428 (821–832)	10 years, 3 months, 27 days	Al Shariqa	Al Shariqa	Idris Imaduddin		7. Maulaya Hasan bin Maulaya Adam; (Ahmedabad)	
19	Idris Imaduddin bin Hasan Badruddin ادريس عماد الدين بن حسن	1429–1467 (832–872)	40 years, 9 months, 16 days	Shibaam	Shibaam	Syedi Ma'ad Ezzuddin (died 839/840 AH) Al Maula Masad bin Abdullah		7. Maulaya Hasan bin Maulaya Adam; (Ahmedabad)	Branching off of the Sunni Bohra
20	Hasan Badruddin II bin Syedna Idris Imaduddin حسن بدر الدين بن إدريس عماد الدين	1467–1512 (872–918)	45 years, 8 months, 26 days	Masaar	Shibaam	Syedi Abdullah Fakhruddin Syedna Husain Husamuddin	Syedna Ali Shamsuddin III bin Syedna Husain Husamuddin	7. Maulaya Hasan bin Maulaya Adam; (Ahmedabad)	
20	Hasan Badruddin II bin Syedna Idris Imaduddin حسن بدر الدين بن إدريس عماد الدين	1467–1512 (872–918)	45 years, 8 months, 26 days	Masaar	Shibaam	Syedi Abdullah Fakhruddin Syedna Husain Husamuddin	Syedna Ali Shamsuddin III bin Syedna Husain Husamuddin	8. Moulai Raj bin Hasan	
21	Husain Husamuddin bin Syedna Idris Imaduddin حسين حسام الدين بن إدريس عمادالدين	1512–1527 (918–933)	15 years, 1 month, 25 days	Masaar	Shibaam	Syedna Ali Shamsuddin III bin Syedna Husain Husamuddin	Syedna Mohammed Ezzuddin bin Syedna Hasan Badruddin II	8. Moulai Raj bin Hasan	
21	Husain Husamuddin bin Syedna Idris Imaduddin حسين حسام الدين بن إدريس عمادالدين	1512–1527 (918–933)	15 years, 1 month, 25 days	Masaar	Shibaam	Syedna Ali Shamsuddin III bin Syedna Husain Husamuddin	Syedna Mohammed Ezzuddin bin Syedna Hasan Badruddin II	9. Moulai Jafer bin Raj, (Ahmedabad)	
21	Husain Husamuddin bin Syedna Idris Imaduddin حسين حسام الدين بن إدريس عمادالدين	1512–1527 (918–933)	15 years, 1 month, 25 days	Masaar	Shibaam	Syedna Ali Shamsuddin III bin Syedna Husain Husamuddin	Syedna Mohammed Ezzuddin bin Syedna Hasan Badruddin II	10. Moulai Wahhab bin Firoz	
21	Husain Husamuddin bin Syedna Idris Imaduddin حسين حسام الدين بن إدريس عمادالدين	1512–1527 (918–933)	15 years, 1 month, 25 days	Masaar	Shibaam	Syedna Ali Shamsuddin III bin Syedna Husain Husamuddin	Syedna Mohammed Ezzuddin bin Syedna Hasan Badruddin II	11. Syedi QasimKhan bin Hasan; (d. 950AH)(Ahmedabad)	
22	Ali Shamsuddin III bin Syedna Husain Husamuddin علي شمس الدين بن حسين	1527–1527 (933–933)	1 month, 11 days	Masaar	Zabid	Syedna Mohammed Izzuddin I			
23	Syedna Mohammed Izzuddin I محمد عز الدين بن حسن	1527–1539 (933–946)	12 years, 3 months, 6 days	Zabid	Zabid	Syedna Yusuf Najmuddin I			
24	Yusuf Najmuddin I bin Sulaiman يوسف نجم الدين بن سليمان	1539–1567 (946–974)	28 years, 9 months, 19 days	Taibah	Siddhpur, India	Syedna Jalal Shamsuddin bin Hasan	Syedi Miyasaheb Musaji		Mughal Emperor Humayun grants free trade to Bohras. Building of stepwell and separate bazaar in Siddhpur
24	Yusuf Najmuddin I bin Sulaiman يوسف نجم الدين بن سليمان	1539–1567 (946–974)	28 years, 9 months, 19 days	Taibah	Siddhpur, India	Syedna Jalal Shamsuddin bin Hasan	Syedi Miyasaheb Musaji	12. Syedna Jalal Shamsuddin bin Hasan	Mughal Emperor Humayun grants free trade to Bohras. Building of stepwell and separate bazaar in Siddhpur

=== Dua't Hindiyah (1539–present) ===
Dua't Mutlaqeen Seated in India
No.	Name	Dai Period CE (AH)	Tenure	Resting Place	Place of Dai Office	Mazoon al-Da'wat	Mukaasir al-Da'wat	Notable Events & Figures
25	Jalal Shamshuddin bin Hasan جلال شمش الدين بن حسن	1567–1568 (974–975)	4 months	Ahmedabad	Ahmedabad	Dawood Burhanuddin bin Ajabshah		
26	Dawood Burhanuddin bin Ajabshah	1568–1589 (975–997)	22 years, 11 days	Ahmedabad	Ahmedabad	Dawood Burhanuddin bin QutubShah bin Khwaja bin Ali	Syedi QaziKhan Shujauddin bin AminShah	Syedi Musan-ji bin Taj martyred in boiling oil. Syedi Khoj bin Malak.
27	Dawood Burhanuddin bin QutubShah bin Khwaja bin Ali	1589–1612 (999–1021)	24 years, 1 month, 17 days	Ahmedabad	Ahmedabad	Syedi QaziKhan Shujauddin bin AminShah (died 999/1591) ShaikhAdam Safiyuddin	Syedi Ameen-ji bin Jalal Maulaya Ali Mohammad bin Firoz ShaikhAdam Safiyuddin	Branching off of the Sulaimani Bohras
28	Sheikh Adam Safiuddin bin TaiyibShah	1612–1621 (1021–1030)	9 years, 21 days	Ahmedabad	Ahmedabad	Abduttayyeb Zakiuddin	Syedi Ali Mohammad bin Firoz	
29	Abduttayyeb Zakiuddin I	1622–1633	1030–1041		Ahmedabad	Ali Shamsuddin	Qasim Khan Zainuddin	Branching off of the Alavi Bohras.
30	Ali Shamsuddin IV bin Moulai Hasan	1633–1634	1041–1042		Hisne Afidah, Sana'a Governorate, Yemen	Qasim Khan Zainuddin		
31	Qasim Khan Zainuddin bin Feerkhan	1634–1646	1042–1054		Ahmedabad	Qutub Khan Qutbuddin		
32	Qutub Khan Qutbuddin Shaheed	1646–1648	1054–1056		Ahmedabad	Feer Khan Shujauddin		
33	Feer Khan Shujauddin bin Syedi Ahmedji	1648–1657	1056–1065		Ahmedabad	Ismail Badruddin		
34	Ismail Badruddin I bin Syedi Moulai Raj Saheb	1657–1676	1065–1085		Jamnagar	Syedi Najamkhan Syedi Abdutaiyyeb Zakiyuddin	Al Maula Abdul Waheed Al Maula Shams Khan	
35	Abduttayyeb Zakiuddin II bin Syedna Ismail Badruddin I	1676–1692	1085–1110		Jamnagar	Musa Kalimuddin	Sheikh Adam Safiyuddin	
36	Musa Kalimuddin bin Abduttayyeb Zakiuddin II	1692–1711	1110–1122		Jamnagar	Sheikh Adam Safiyuddin Noor Mohammad Nooruddin	Syedi Khanji Pheer	
37	Noor Mohammad Nooruddin bin Musa Kalimuddin	1711–1719	1122–1130	Mandvi	Jamnagar	Syedi Qasimkhan bin Syedi Hamzabhai Ismail Badruddin bin Sheikh Adam	Syedi Hakimuddin bin Bawa Mulla Khan Syedi Esamkhan Sheikh Dawoodbhai	
38	Ismail Badruddin II bin Syedi Sheikh Aadam	1719–1738	1130–1150		Jamnagar	Syedi Kassim Khan bin Syedi Hamzabhai Syedi Abdul Qadir Hakimuddin bin Bawa Mulla Khan	Syedi Shams bin Sheikh Hasan Khan	
39	Ibrahim Wajiuddin bin Syedi Abdul Qadir	1738–1756	1150–1168		Ujjain	Syedi Sheikh Adam bin Nooruddin Syedna Hebatullahil Moaiyadfiddeen	Syedi Ali bin Phirji	
40	Hebatullahil Moaiyadfiddeen bin Syedna Ibrahim Wajiuddin	1756–1780	1168–1193		Ujjain	Syedi Lukmanji bin Sheikh Dawood Syedi Khan Bahadur Sheikh Fazal Abdultaiyyeb Syedi Hamza	Syedi Abde Musa Kalimuddin	Branching off of the Hebtiahs Bohra.
41	Abduttayyeb Zakiuddin III bin Syedna Badruddin	1780–1787	1193–1200		Burhanpur	Syedi Sheikh Adam Safiyuddin Syedna Yusuf Najmuddin	Syedna Abdeali Saifuddin	
42	Yusuf Najmuddin II bin Syedna Abduttayyeb Zakiuddin III	1787–1799	1200–1213		Surat	Syedi Sheikh Adam Safiyuddin Syedna Abdeali Saifuddin	Syedi Qamruddin Sheikh Adam	
43	Abde Ali Saifuddin bin Syedna Abduttayyeb Zakiuddin III	1799–1817	1213–1232		Surat	Syedi Sheikh Adam Safiyuddin Syedna Mohammad Ezzuddin	Syedi Qamruddin Syedi Sheikh Adam	
44	Mohammed Ezzuddin bin Syedi Jivanjee	1817–1821	1232–1236		Surat	Syedi Sheikh Adam Bhaisaheb Safiyuddin	Syedna Taiyyeb Zainuddin	
45	Tayyeb Zainuddin bin Syedi Jivanjee	1821–1836	1236–1252		Surat	Syedi Sheikh Adam Safiyuddin Syedi Hebatullah Bhaisaheb Jamaluddin	Syedna Mohammed Badruddin	
46	Mohammed Badruddin bin Syedna Abde Ali Saifuddin	1836–1840	1252–1256		Surat	Syedi Hebtullah Bhaisaheb Jamaluddin	Syedna Abdulqadir Najmuddin	
47	Abdul Qadir Najmuddin bin Syedna Tayyeb Zainuddin	1840–1885	1256–1302		Ujjain	Syedi Hebtullah Bhaisaheb Jamaluddin Syedna Abdulhusain Husamuddin	Syedi Abdeali Imaduddin Syedi Ismail Bhaisaheb Badruddin	Branching off of the Atba-e-Malak.
48	Abdul Husain Husamuddin bin Syedna Tayyeb Zainuddin	1885–1891	1302–1308		Ahmedabad	Syedi Ismail Bhaisaheb Badruddin	Syedna Mohammad Burhanuddin	
49	Mohammed Burhanuddin I bin Syedna Abdul Qadir Najmuddin	1891–1906	1308–1323		Surat	Syedi Ismail Bhaisaheb Badruddin	Syedi Hasan Bhaisaheb Zakiuddin Syedi Husain Bhaisaheb Ezzuddin	
50	Abdullah Badruddin bin Syedna Abdul Husain Husamuddin	1906–1915	1323–1333		Surat	Syedi Ismail Bhaisaheb Badruddin Syedi Dawood Bhaisaheb Shehabuddin	Syedi Ibrahim Bhaisaheb Vajihuddin Syedi Taiyyeb Bhaisaheb Zainuddin	
51	Taher Saifuddin bin Syedna Mohammed Burhanuddin I	1915–1965	1333–1385		Mumbai	Syedi Dawood Bhaisaheb Shahabuddin Syedi Fazal Bhaisaheb Qutbuddin Syedna Mohammed Burhanuddin	Syedi Eshaq Bhaisaheb Jamaluddin Syedi Saleh Bhaisaheb Safiyuddin	
52	Mohammed Burhanuddin II bin Syedna Taher Saifuddin	1965–2014	1385–1435		Mumbai		Syedi Saleh Bhaisaheb Safiyuddin Syedi Hussain Bhaisaheb Husamuddin	Branching off of the Progressive Dawoodi Bohra
53	Abu Jafar us Sadiq Aali Qadar Mufaddal Saifuddin	2014–Present	1435–Present		Mumbai	Syedi Hussain Bhaisaheb Husamuddin Syedi Qasim Bhaisaheb Hakimuddin Syedi Aliasghar Bhaisaheb Kalimuddin Syedi Qaidjoher Bhaisaheb Ezzuddin	Syedi Qasim Bhaisaheb Hakimuddin Syedi Aliasghar Bhaisaheb Kalimuddin Syedi Qaidjoher Bhaisaheb Ezzuddin Syedi Malik ul Ashtar Bhaisaheb Shujauddin	See Succession to the 52nd Dai al-Mutlaq for further information.

Prominent Dai's resting places From Yemen to Mumbai

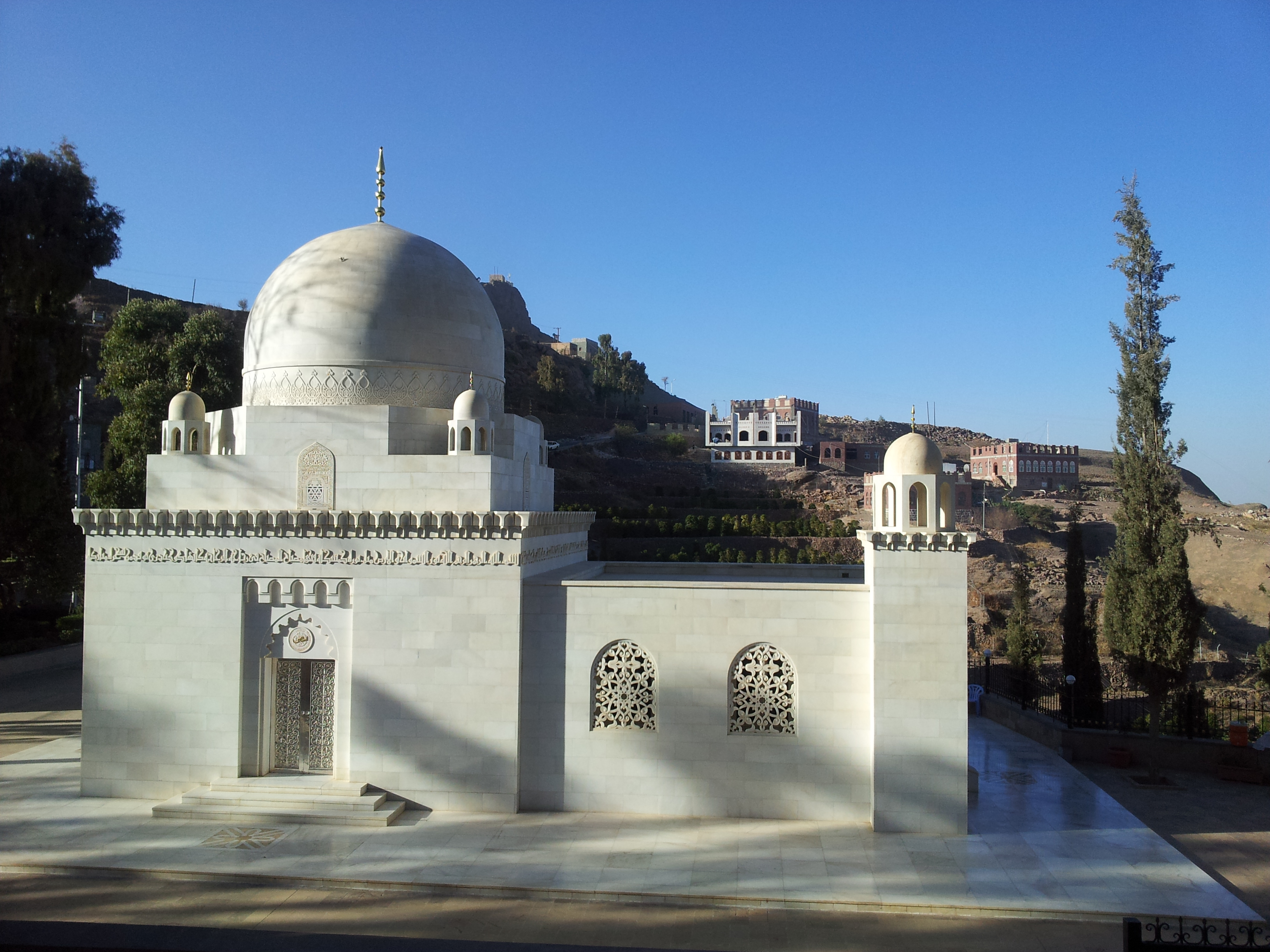
Mausoleum Syedna Hatim, Yemen

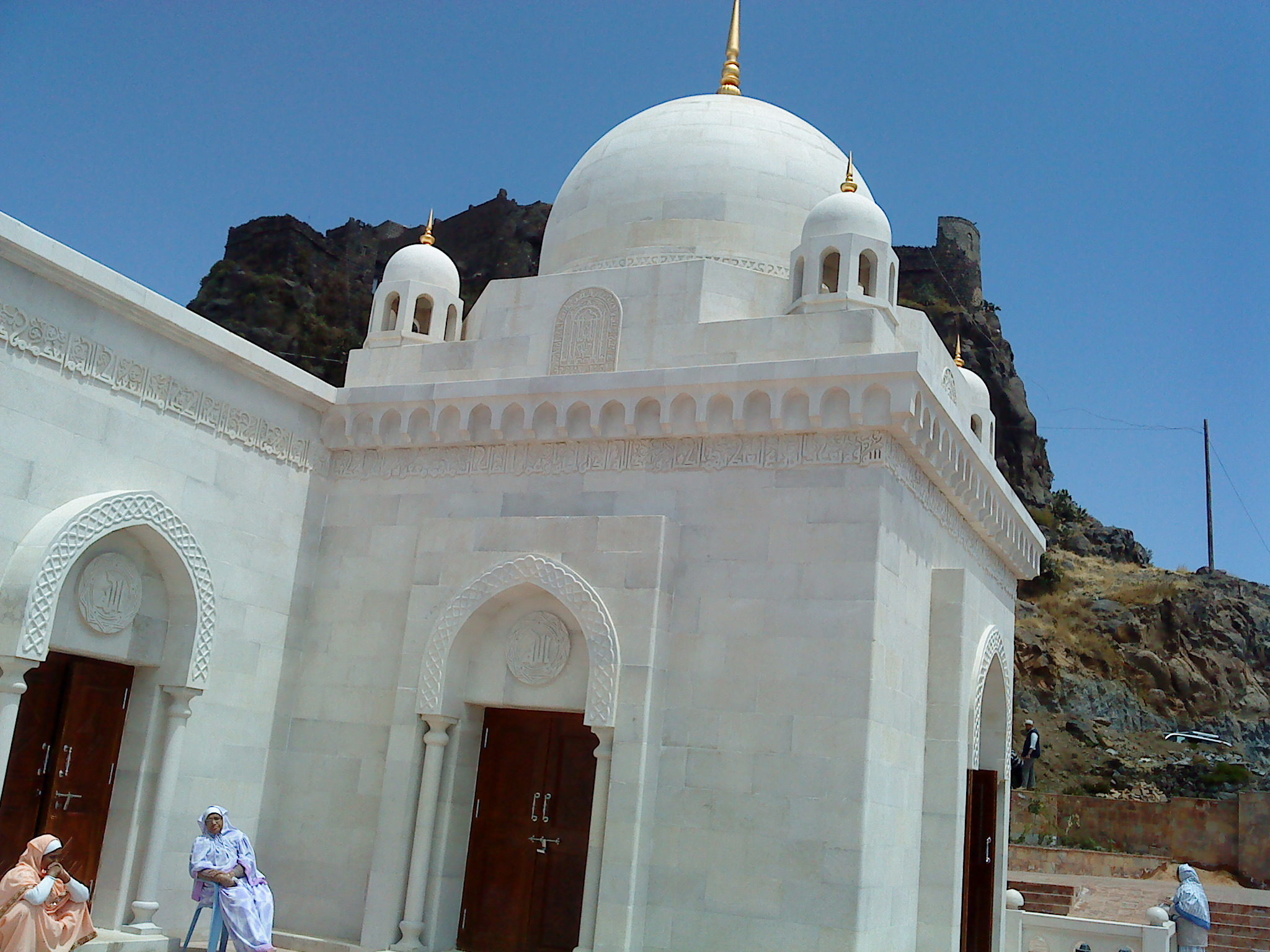
Mausoleum Syedna Idris, Yemen

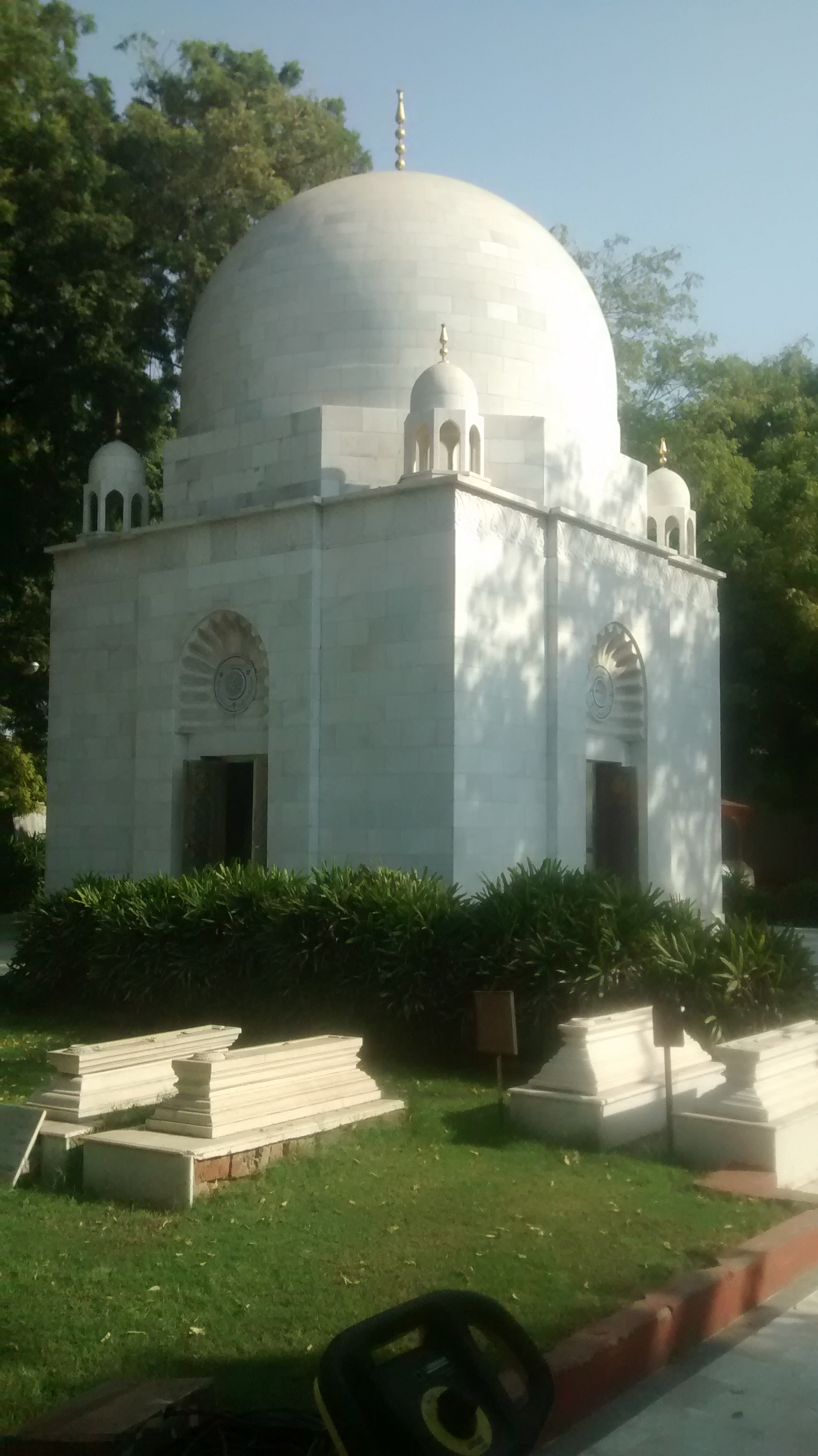
Mausoleum Syedna Jalal Shamsuddin, ahmedabad

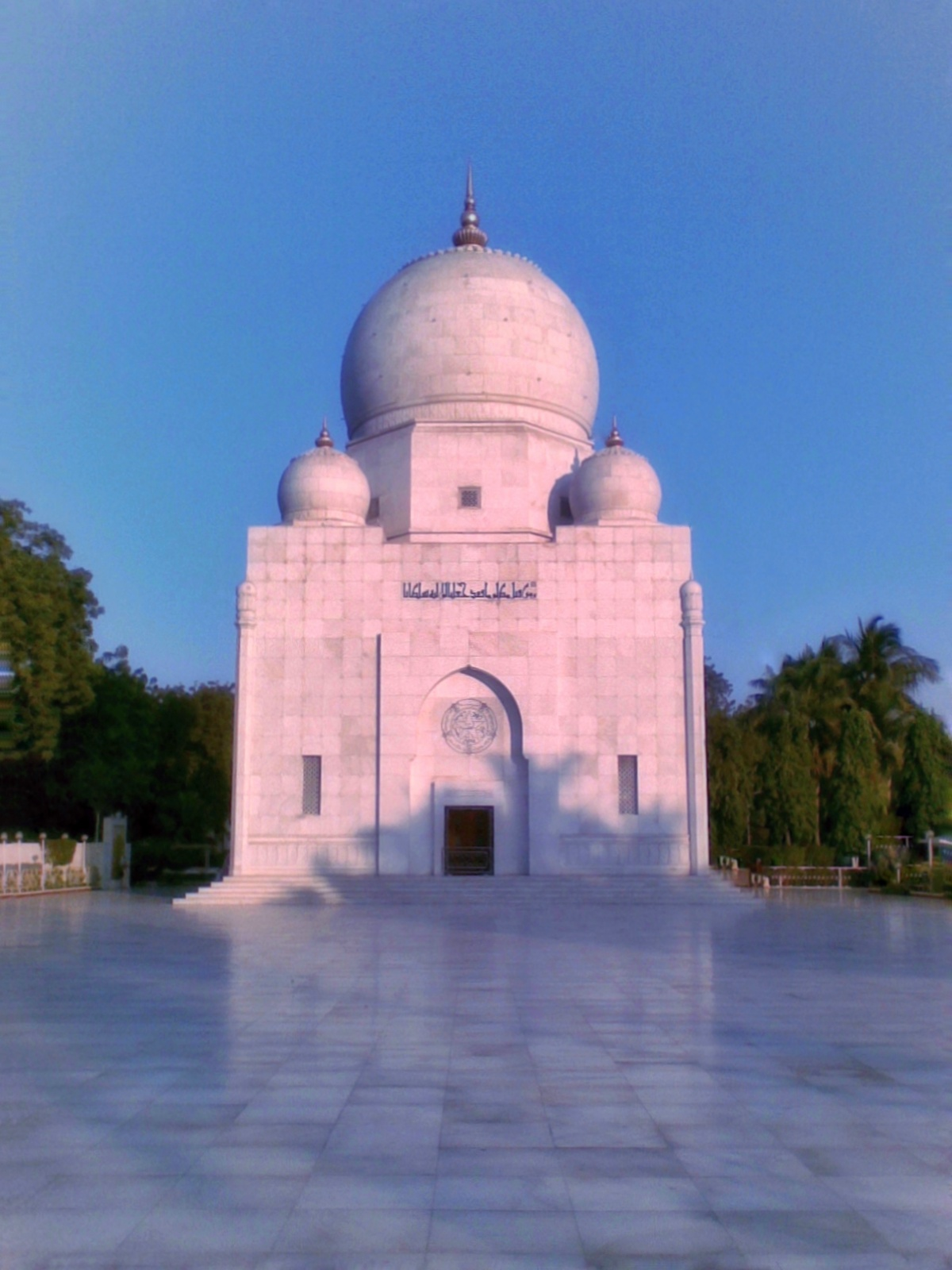
Mazar e Qutbi, Ahmedabad

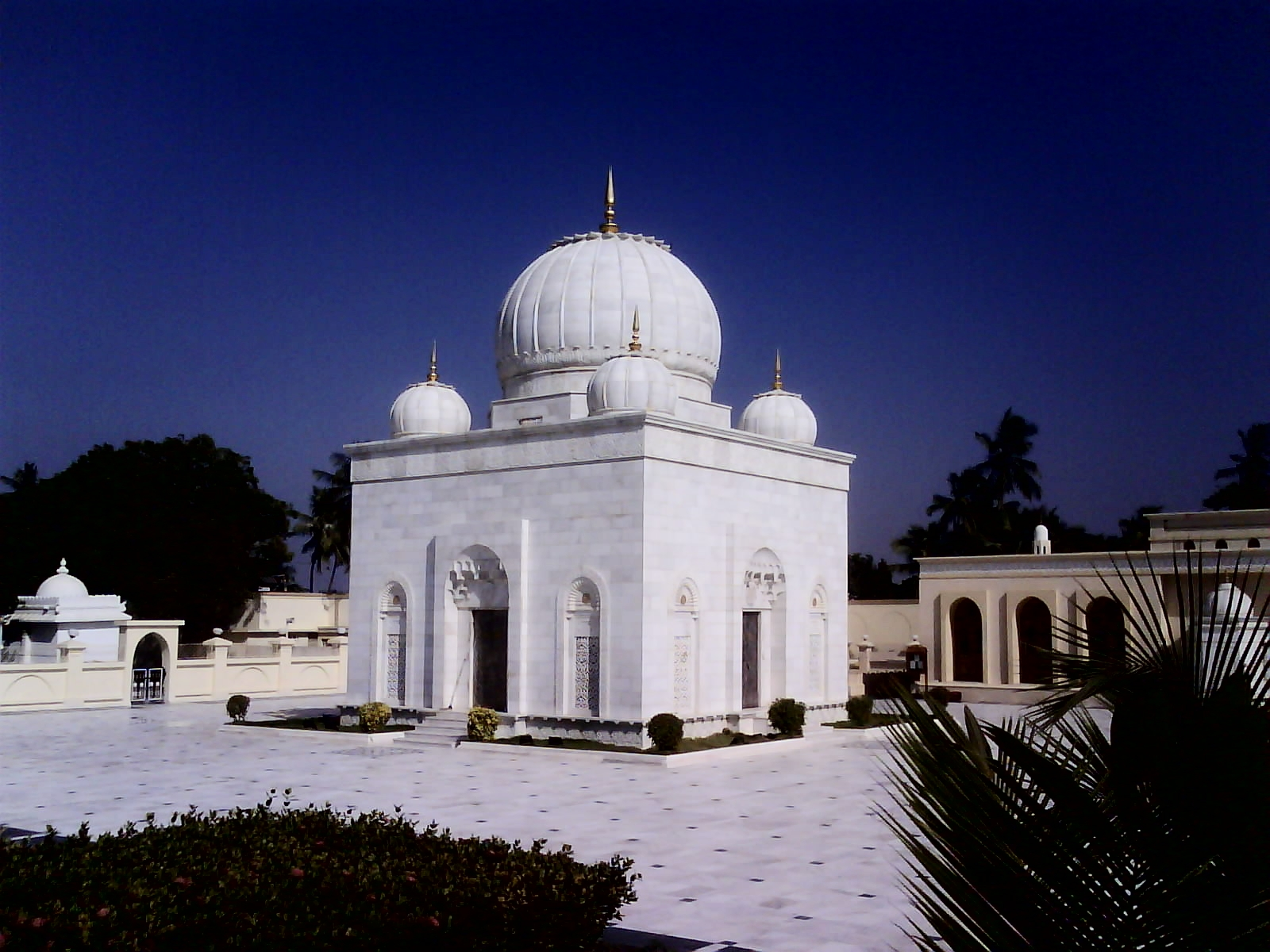
Mazar e Noorani, Mandvi, Gujarat

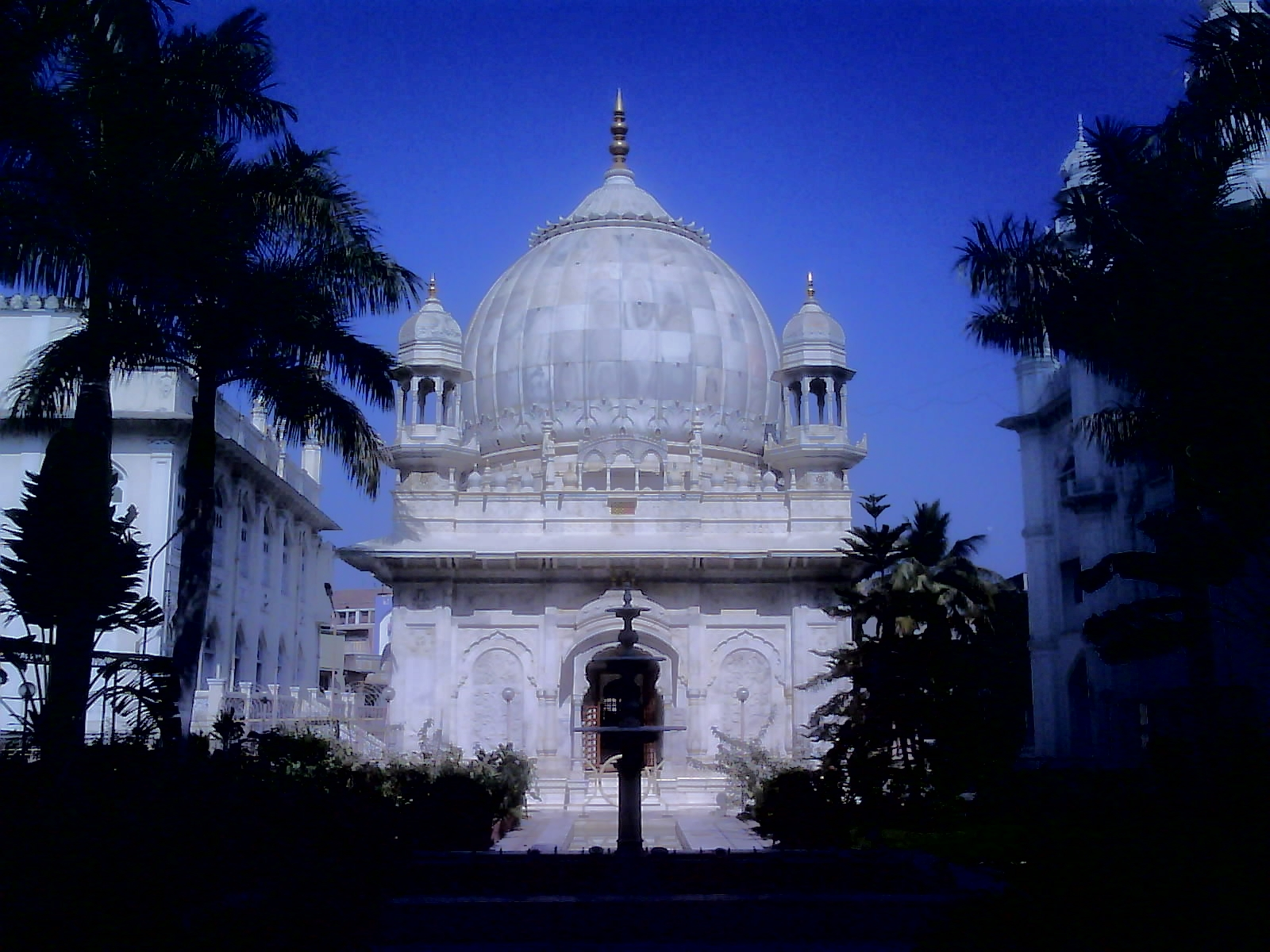
Mazar e Najmi in Ujjain

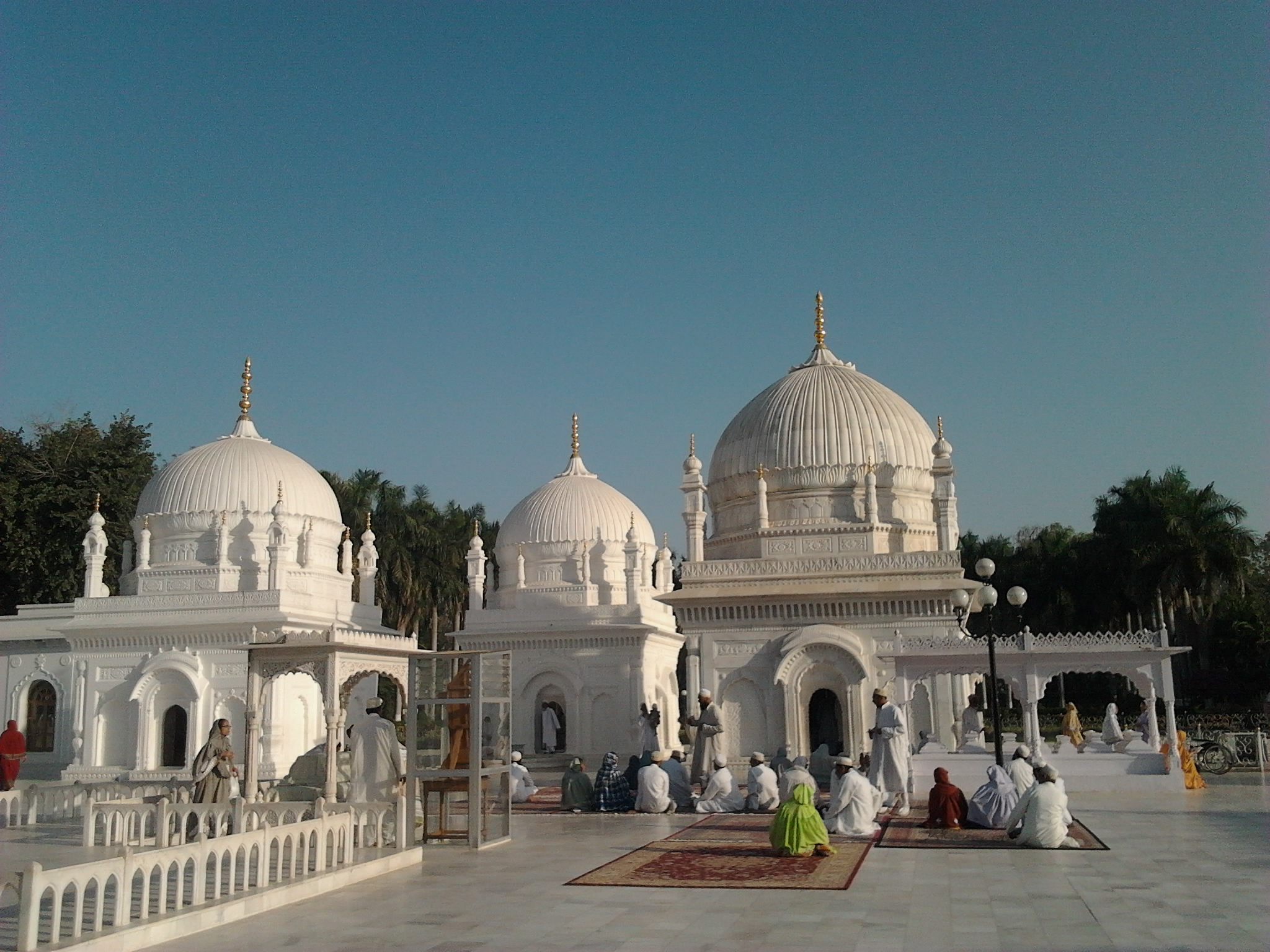
Mazare Hakimi, Burhanpur

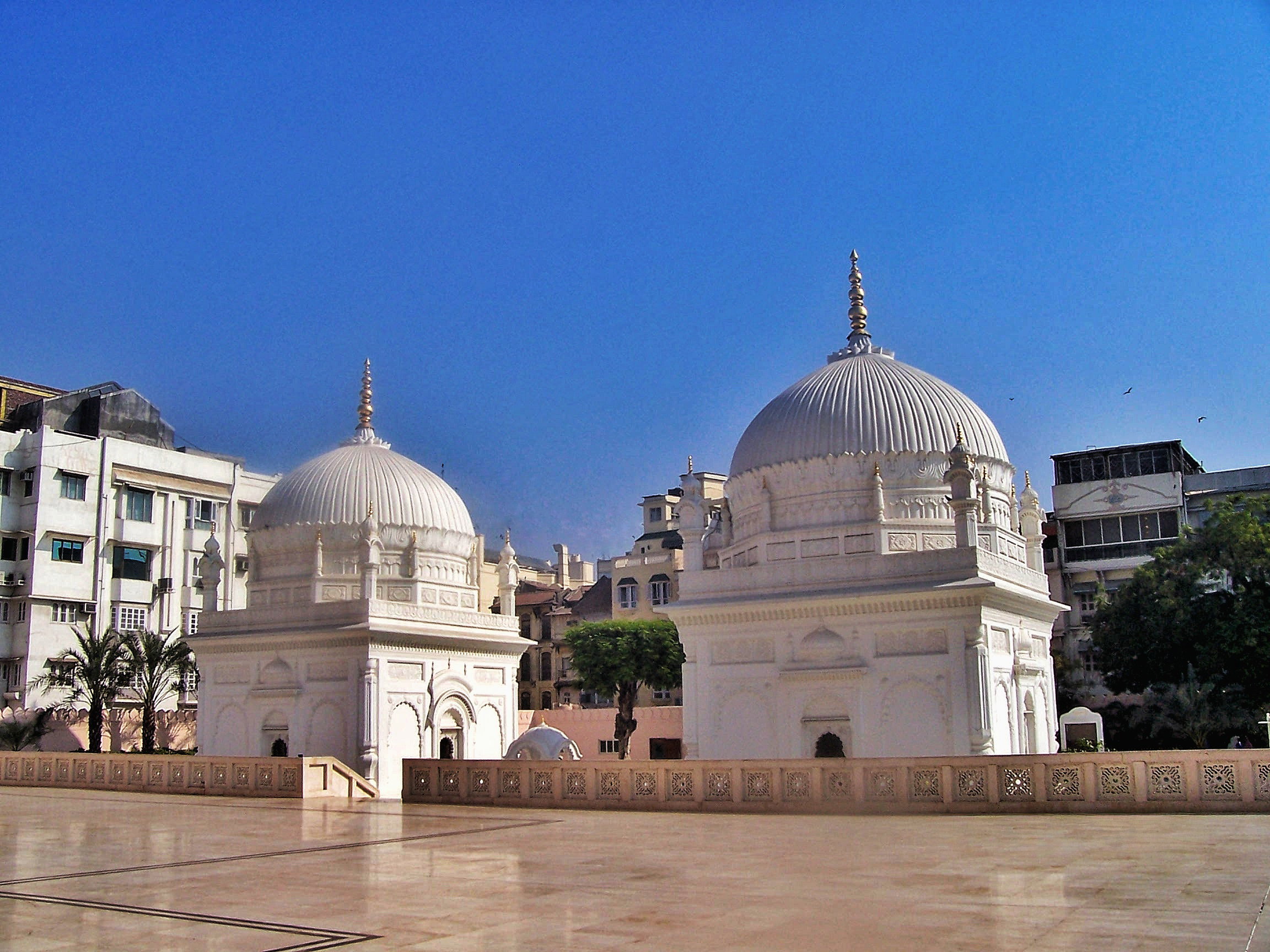
Mazar e Saifee Surat

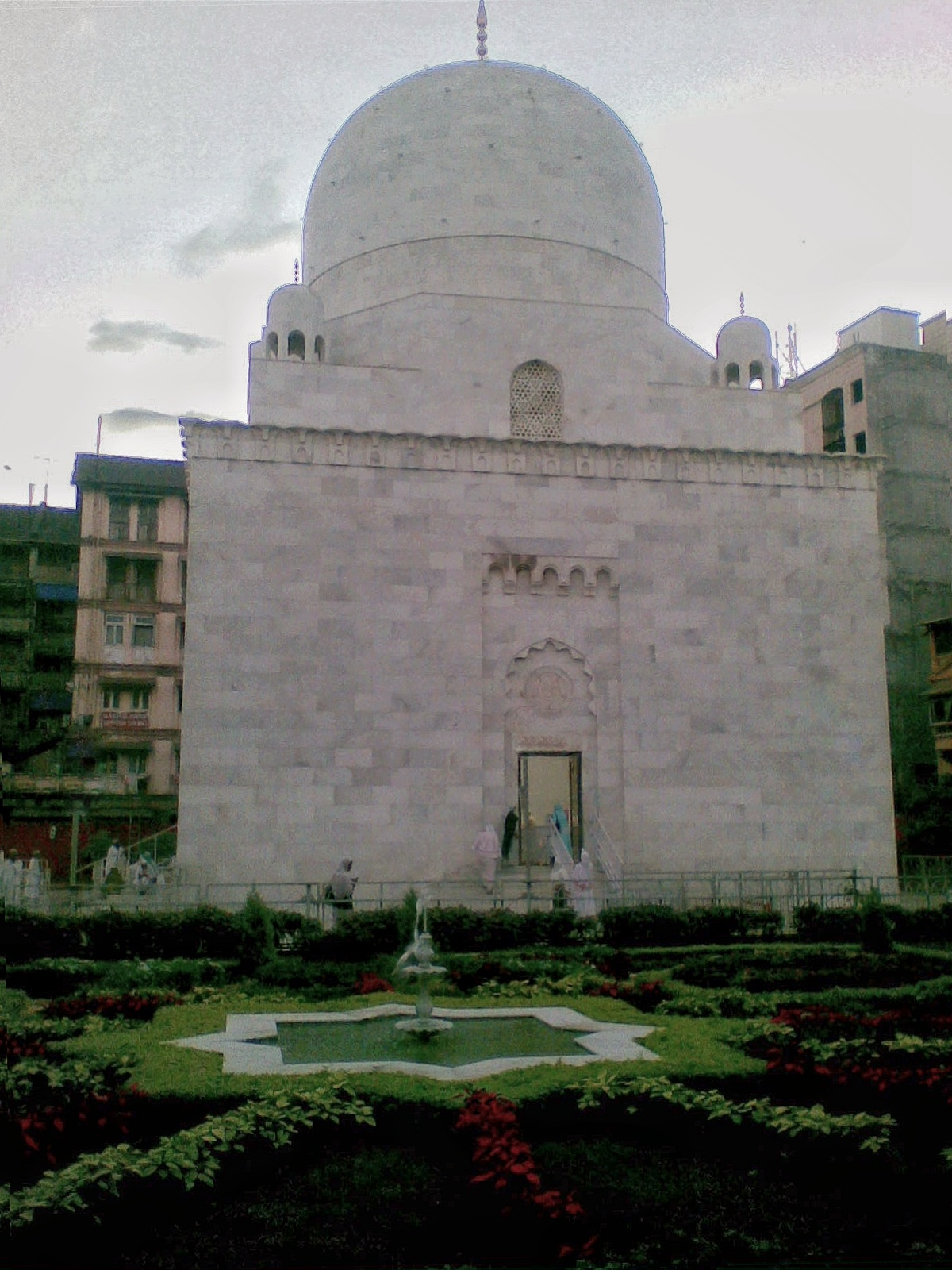
Raudat Tahera, Mumbai
