= Dawood Bin Ajabshah =

Syedna Dawood bin Ajabshah Buruhanuddin 26th Da'i al-Mutlaq of the Dawoodi Bohra
- داؤد بن عجبشاه بُرهان الدين
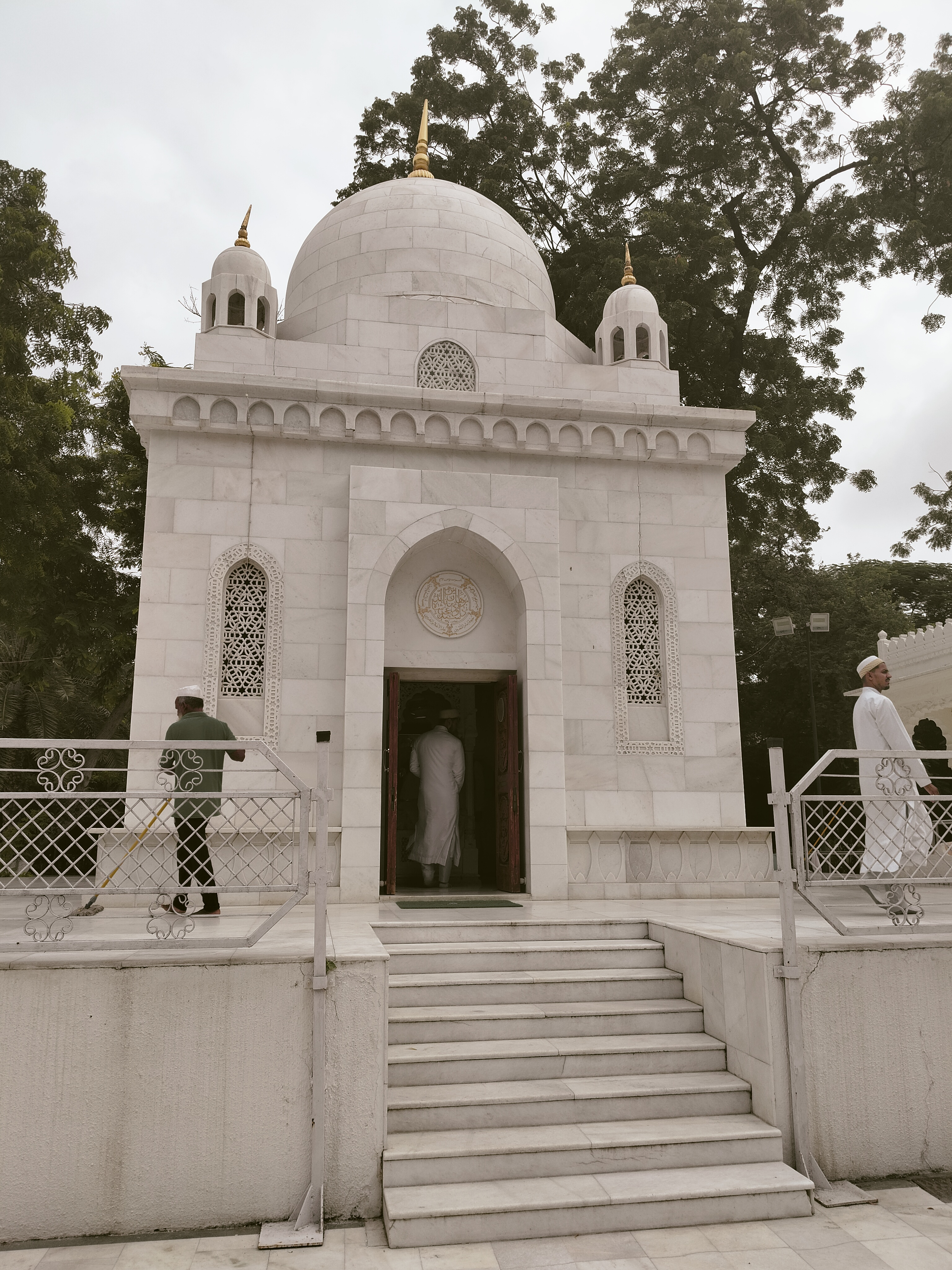

Da'i al-Mutlaq
- In office 1568 AD (975 AH) – 1591 AD (999 AH)
- Preceded by: Jalal Shamshuddin bin Hasan
- Succeeded by: Dawood Bin Qutubshah (According to Dawoodi Bohra); Sulayman bin Hassan (According to Sulaymani bohras)
- Title: Syedna; Maulana; Da'i al-Mutlaq; Da'i al-Fatemi
- Died: 27 Rabi ul Aakhir 999 AH/1591 AD
- Parent: Mawlaya Ajabshah (father)

Religious life
- Religion: Islam
- Sect: Isma'ili; Tayyibi
- Jurisprudence: Mustaali

Syedna Dawood Bin Maulai Ajab Shah Burhanuddin (died on 27 Rabi ul Aakhir 999 AH AH/1591 AD) in Ahmedabad, Gujarat, India was the 26th Da'i al-Mutlaq (Absolute Missionary) of the Dawoodi Bohra branch of Musta‘lī Islam. He succeeded the 25th Dai Syedna Jalal Shamshuddin bin Hasan to the religious post.

== Life ==
Syedna Dawood was born in the year 1523. After acquiring elementary education in Ahmedabad, he travelled to Yemen for further studies under Syedna Yusuf Najmuddin I.

Upon returning to Ahmadabad, he served under Syedna Jalal Shamshuddin bin Hasan. In 1574, under persecution from Mohammad bin Taher Neherwali and local governor Meer Jahan, Syedna Jalal left Ahmadabad to Vadodara. In 1583, he moved to Kapadvanj and stayed over there for 3 months.

During his tenure, some of the lost fortresses in Yemen were recaptured. Burial sites of previous dais were also identified in Hisne Afeda in 1578.

Syedna Dawood's health declined after his leg was injured by a nail. He died at the age of 67.

== Succession controversy ==
Syedna Dawood became Da'i al-Mutlaq in 975 AH /1539 AD. His period of Da'awat was from 975-999 AH/ 1568-1591 AD (23 Years).

As per Dawoodi and Alavi Bohras Syedna Dawood bin Maulai Ajab Shah conferred Nass upon 27th Dai Syedna Dawood Bin Qutubshah, whereas Sulaymanis believe the nass was conferred upon Sulayman bin Hassan.

== Gallery ==
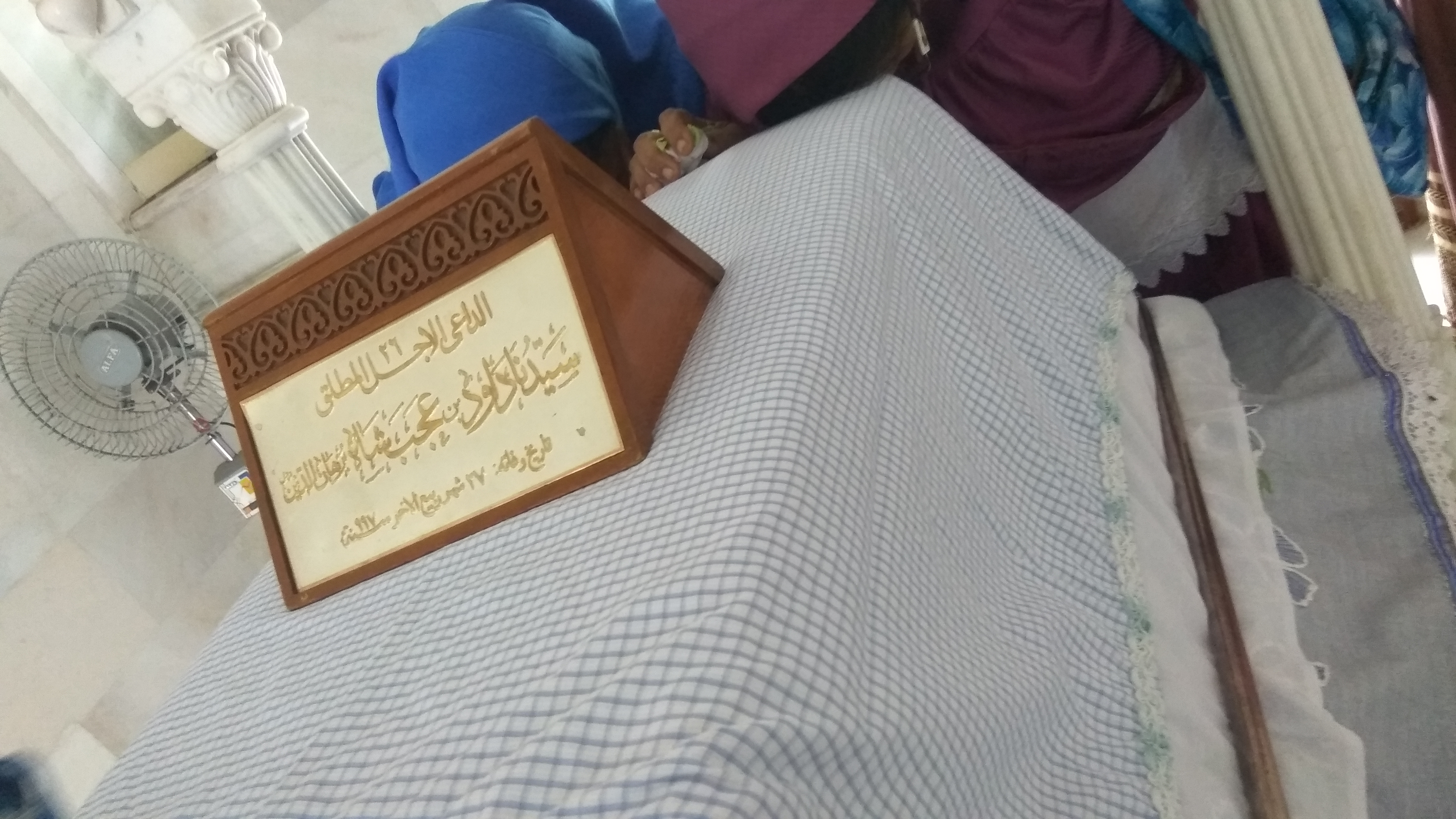
Grave 26th Dai Syedna Dawood bin Ajab shah

Shia Islam titles
Dawood Bin Ajabshah Dā'ī al-Mutlaq Died: 27 Rabi ul Aakhir 999 AH AH/1591 AD
Preceded by Jalal Shamshuddin bin Hasan	26th Dā'ī al-Mutlaq; 975–999 AH/ 1568–1591 AD	Succeeded by Dawood Bin Qutubshah
