= Jalal Shamshuddin bin Hasan =

Syedna Jalal Shamsuddin 25th Da'i al-Mutlaq of the Dawoodi Bohra
- جلال شمس الدّين
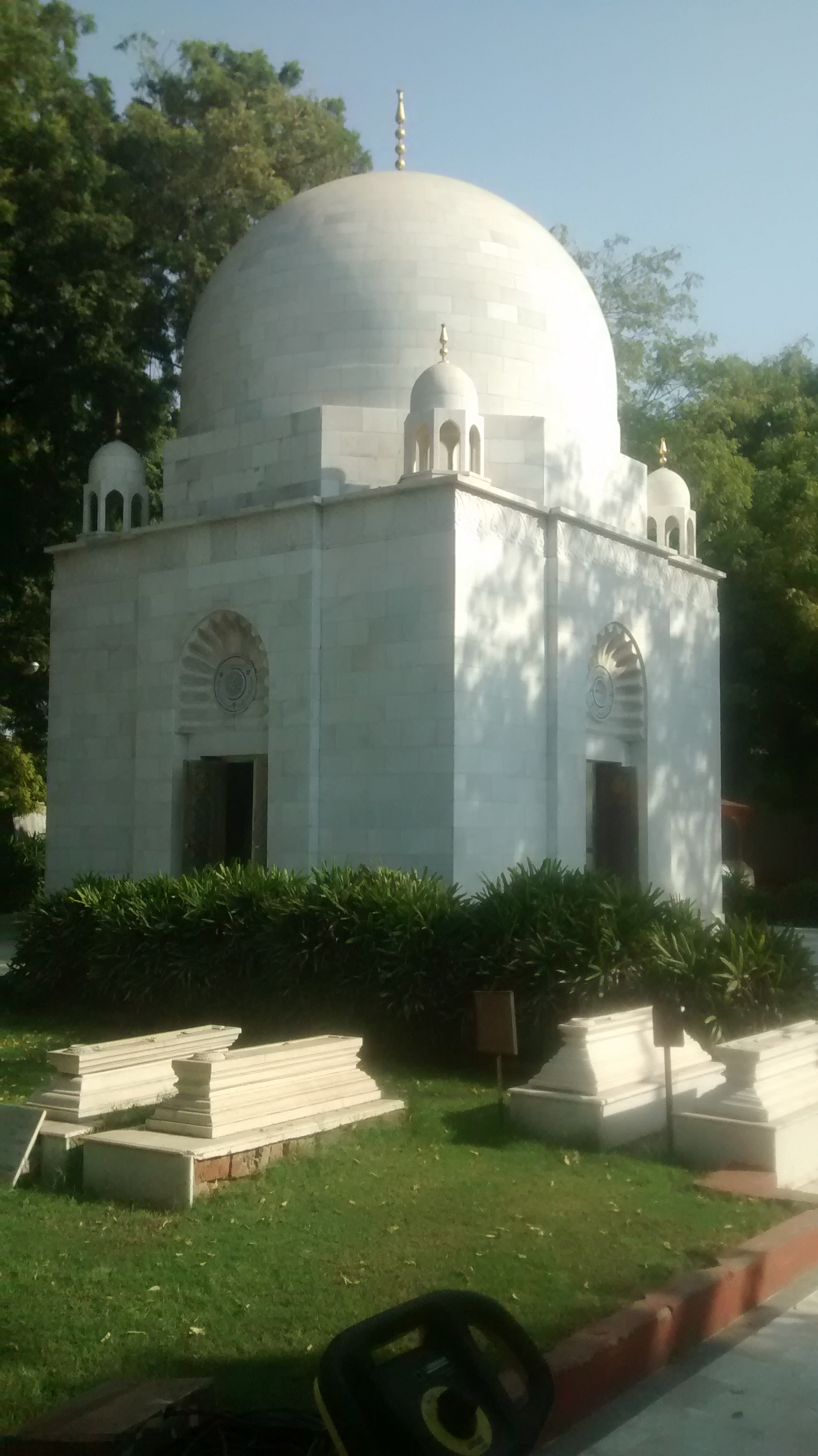
- Mausoleum of Syedna Jalal in Ahmedabad, India

Da'i al-Mutlaq
- In office 1567 AD (974 AH) – 1568 AD AD (975 AH)
- Preceded by: Yusuf Najmuddin ibn Sulaiman
- Succeeded by: Dawood Bin Ajabshah
- Title: Syedna; Maulana; Da'i al-Mutlaq; Da'i al-Fatemi
- Died: 16 Rabi-ul-akhir 975 AH/1568 AD Ahmedabad, India
- Parent: Hasan (father)

Religious life
- Religion: Islam
- Sect: Isma'ili; Dawoodi Bohra
- Jurisprudence: Mustaali; Tayyabi

Syedna Jalal Shamshuddin bin Hasan (died on 16 Rabi-ul-akhir 975 AH/1568 AD in Ahmedabad, Gujarat, India) was the 25th Da'i al-Mutlaq (Absolute Missionary) of the Dawoodi Bohra branch of Musta‘lī Ismaili Islam. He was the first Ismaili Dai in India after the shift of Daawat office from Yemen to India. He succeeded the 24th Dai Syedna Yusuf Najmuddin ibn Sulaiman to the religious post.

== Life ==
Syedna Jalal acquired elementary education from Maulaya Qasim bin Maulaya Hasan. He then traveled to Yemen to seek knowledge from the 23rd and the 24th Dai and studied under Syedi Hasan bin Nooh. After arriving in back to his hometown, Ahmadabad, Syedna Jalal bought a piece of land in Saranpur (a suburb of Ahmadabad) with his personal funds so that a structure could be built that would accommodate a gathering of all followers. He collected all his savings from various businesses to cover the building expenses, but the funds were not sufficient - his personal funds only covered half the expenditure. He was in charge of affairs in India, and had access to funds in treasury. He felt that it was better to draw from it only after obtaining the blessings of Syedna Yusuf. The construction was halted for half a month until Maamji, son of Shaykh Mujaal learned of the stalled work, took it upon himself to manage and finance the project to completion.

Syedna Jalal became Da'i al-Mutlaq in 974 AH /1567 AD. His period of Da'wat was from 974-975 AH/ 1567-1568 AD (<1 Years). Before the appointment of Dai, he was last Wali ul Hind in India working for the movement. Syedna Jalal Shamshuddin appointed or gave nass to Syedna Dawood Bin Ajabshah.

== Mausoleum ==
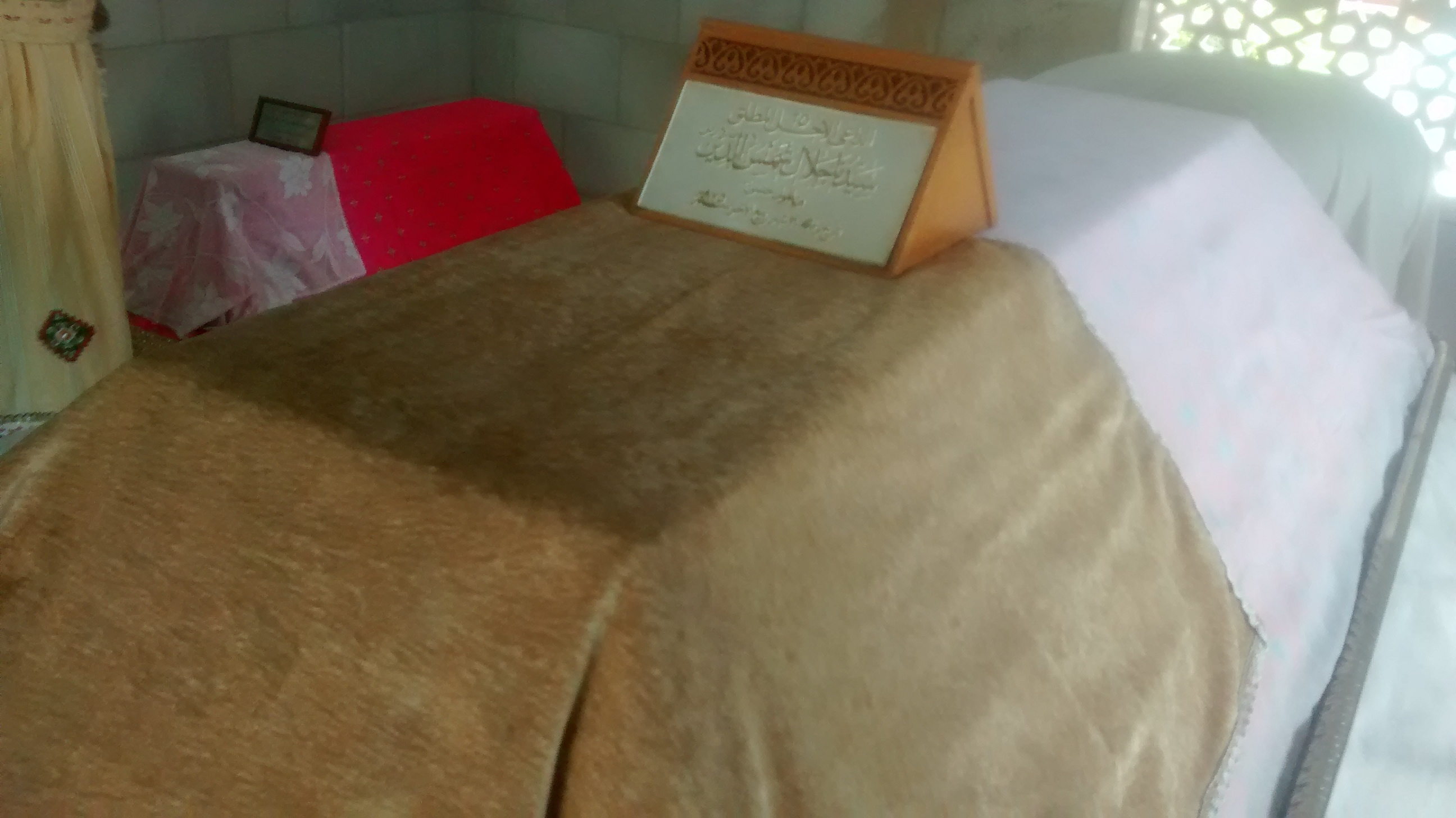
Syedna Jalal's grave in his mausoleum, Ahmedabad.

Syedna Jalal's term of 4 months in office is the shortest among the Dais of India. In 1981, Syedna Mohammed Burhanuddin dedicated a marble mausoleum on the grave of Syedna Jalal. The carved marble designs on the windows of the mausoleum are drawn from Aqmar Mosque in Cairo.

Shia Islam titles
Jalal Shamshuddin bin Hasan Dā'ī al-Mutlaq Died: 16 Rabi-ul-akhir 975 AH/1568 AD in Ahmedabad
| Preceded by Yusuf Najmuddin ibn Sulaiman | 25th Dā'ī al-Mutlaq : 975–999 AH/ 1568–1591 AD | Succeeded by Dawood Bin Ajabshah |
