= Al-Aghmur =

Al-Aghmur الأغمور
- Sub-district
- Location in Yemen
- Coordinates: 15.15184°N 43.76961°E
- Country: Yemen
- Governorate: Sana'a
- District: Manakhah

Population (2004)
  - Total: 4,685
- Time zone: UTC+3

Al-Aghmur (Arabic: الأغمور) is a sub-district located in Manakhah District, Sana'a Governorate, Yemen. Al-Aghmur had a population of 4685 according to the 2004 census.
