= Yusuf Najmuddin I =

Syedna Yusuf Najmuddin 24th Da'i al-Mutlaq of the Dawoodi Bohra
- يوسف نجم الدّين
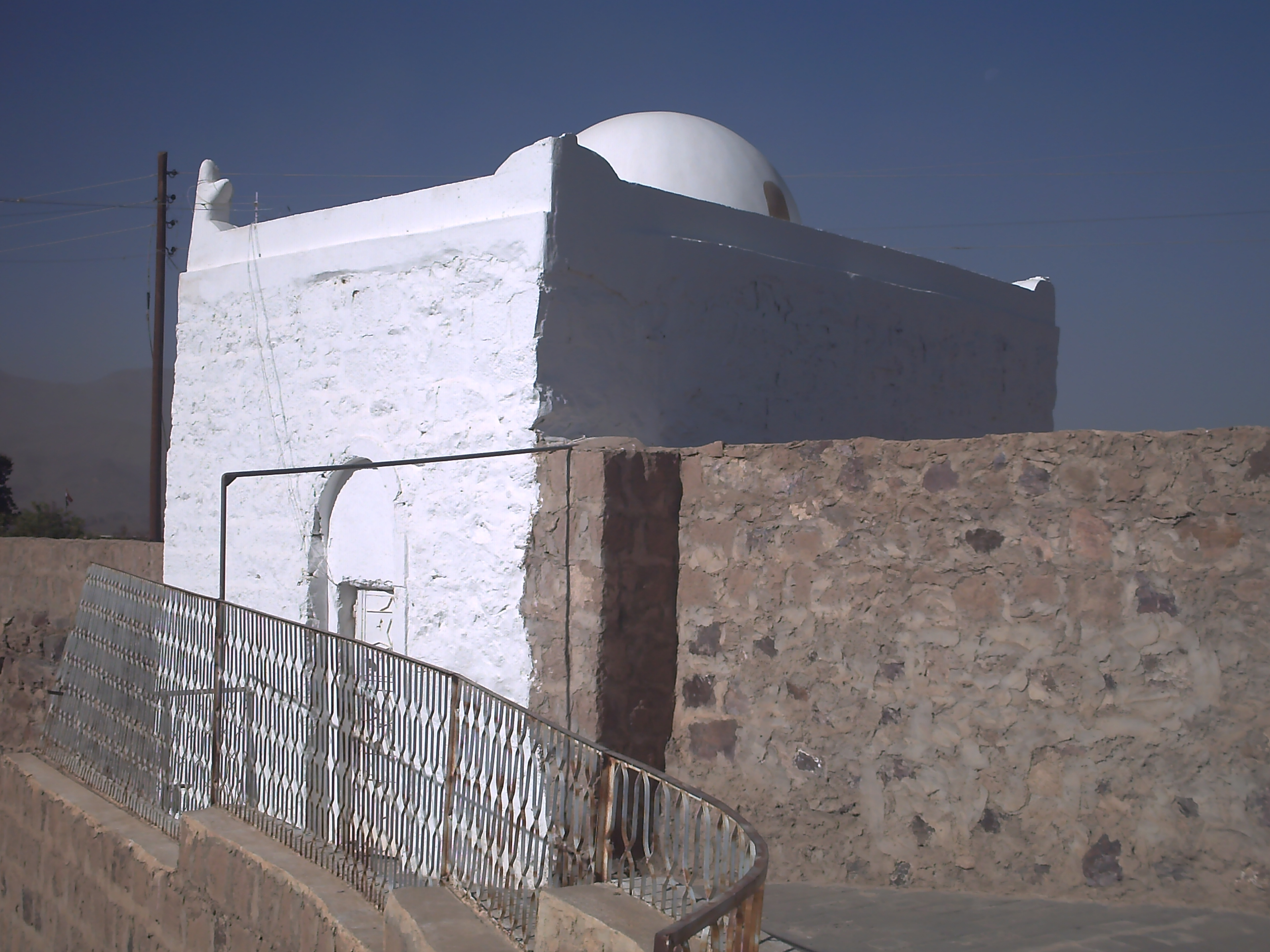
- The mausoleum of Syedna Yusuf in Taibah, Yemen

Da'i al-Mutlaq
- In office 1539 CE (946 AH) – 1567 CE (974 AH)
- Preceded by: Mohammad Ezzuddin
- Succeeded by: Jalal Shamshuddin bin Hasan
- Title: Syedna; Maulana; Da'i al-Mutlaq; Da'i al-Fatemi
- Died: 23 June 1567 CE
- Parents: Sulayman (father); Noor Bibisaheba (mother)

Religious life
- Religion: Islam
- Sect: Isma'ili; Dawoodi Bohra
- Jurisprudence: Mustaali; Tayyabi

Syedna Yusuf Najmuddin bin Sulayman (Arabic: يوسف نجم الدين بن سليمان, romanized: Yūsuf Najm al-Dīn bin Sulaymān) (died on 23 June 1567 CE or 16 Dhu al-Hijjah 974 AH, Taibah, Yemen) was the 24th Da'i al-Mutlaq (Absolute Missionary) of the Taiyabi Ismailis. He succeeded Mohammad Ezzuddin to the religious post.

== Family ==
He hailed from a large family, comprising seven brothers and one sister named Fatema Baisaheba. His father's name was Sulayman while his mother's name was Noor Bibisaheba.

== Life ==
Syedna Yusuf Najmuddin's native city was Sidhpur, Gujarat, India. He was one of many bright students who went to Yemen, to study Islamic education. At first, Syedna Yusuf studied from Syedi Hasan bin Nooh. His sharp intellect and curiosity soon caught the attention of the 23rd Da'i, Syedna Mohammad Ezzuddin, who then personally began to educate him, tutoring him every alternate day. When his learning was complete, Syedna Yusuf returned to India. In the year 1536, Syedna Ezzuddin performed nass upon Syedna Yusuf Najmuddin when he was in Sidhpur. For five years he stayed at Sidhpur, where he built a mosque whose minarets are present even today. In Sidhpur, a dispute arose between his followers and other locals, resulting in a trade boycott against the former. To counter this, Syedna Yusuf instructed his followers to set up their own marketplace. Twenty-four shops were established, and a well was dug specifically for his followers, who were barred from using the local well.

After this, he decided to travel to Yemen, where enemies had captured many fortresses belonging to the Da'wah in the era of Arwain Pasha, who was the governor of the region under Ottoman Turks. Syedna Yusuf recaptured most of the forts that belonged to previous Du'āt. Books and other theological and literary works of the era of previous Du'āt were transferred to India.

== Burial ==
His tenure as da'i was for 28 years, 9 months and 23 days. His grave is located at Taibah in Yemen. It was identified by 52nd Dai Syedna Mohammed Burhanuddin during his first visit to Yemen in 1961.

== Succession ==
Syedna Yusuf Najmuddin gave nass or succession to Jalal Shamshuddin bin Hasan of Ahmedabad as his successor, the 25th Da'i.

== Gallery ==
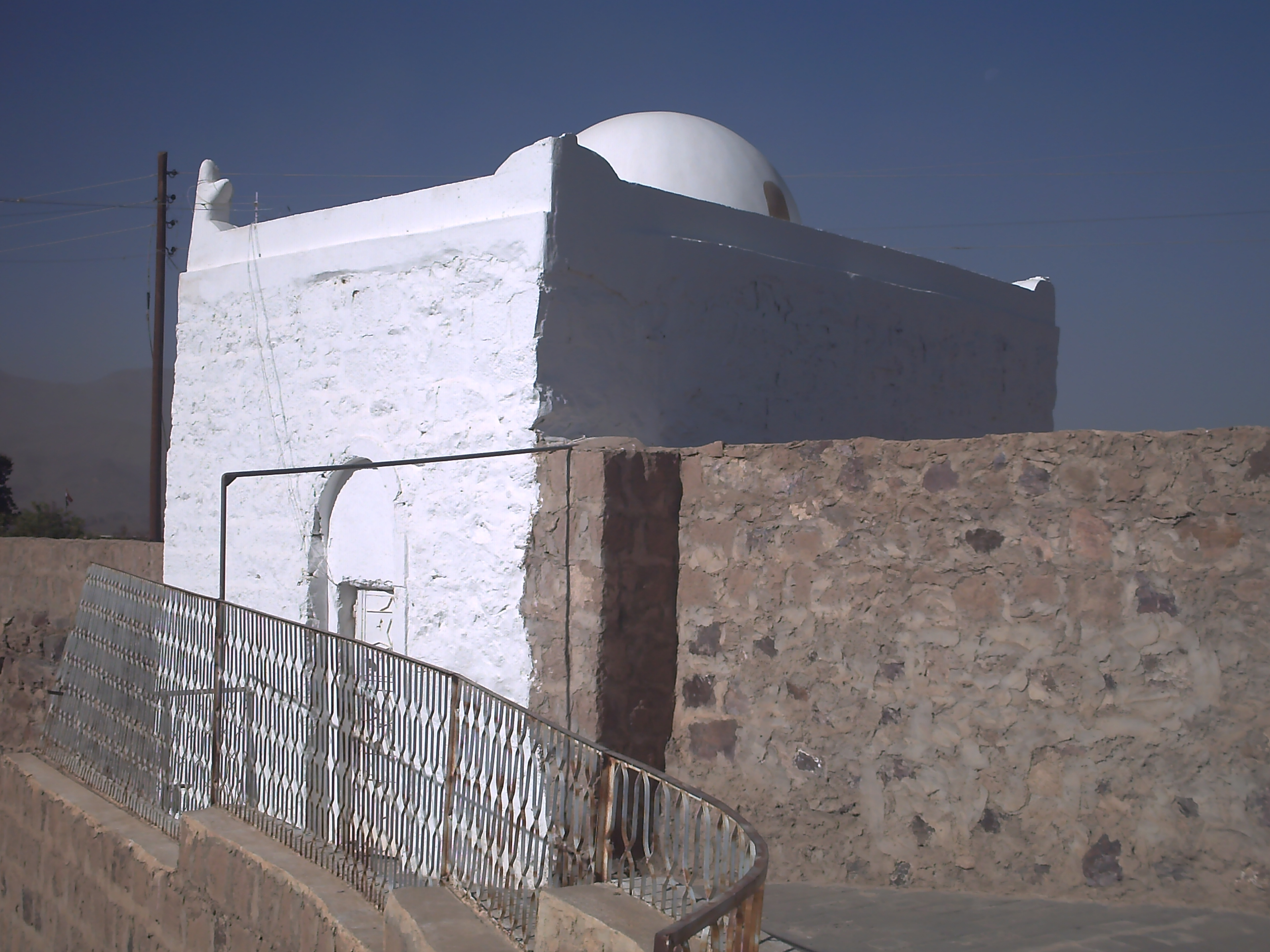
Mausoleum of Syedna Yusuf Najmuddin, Taibah, Yemen

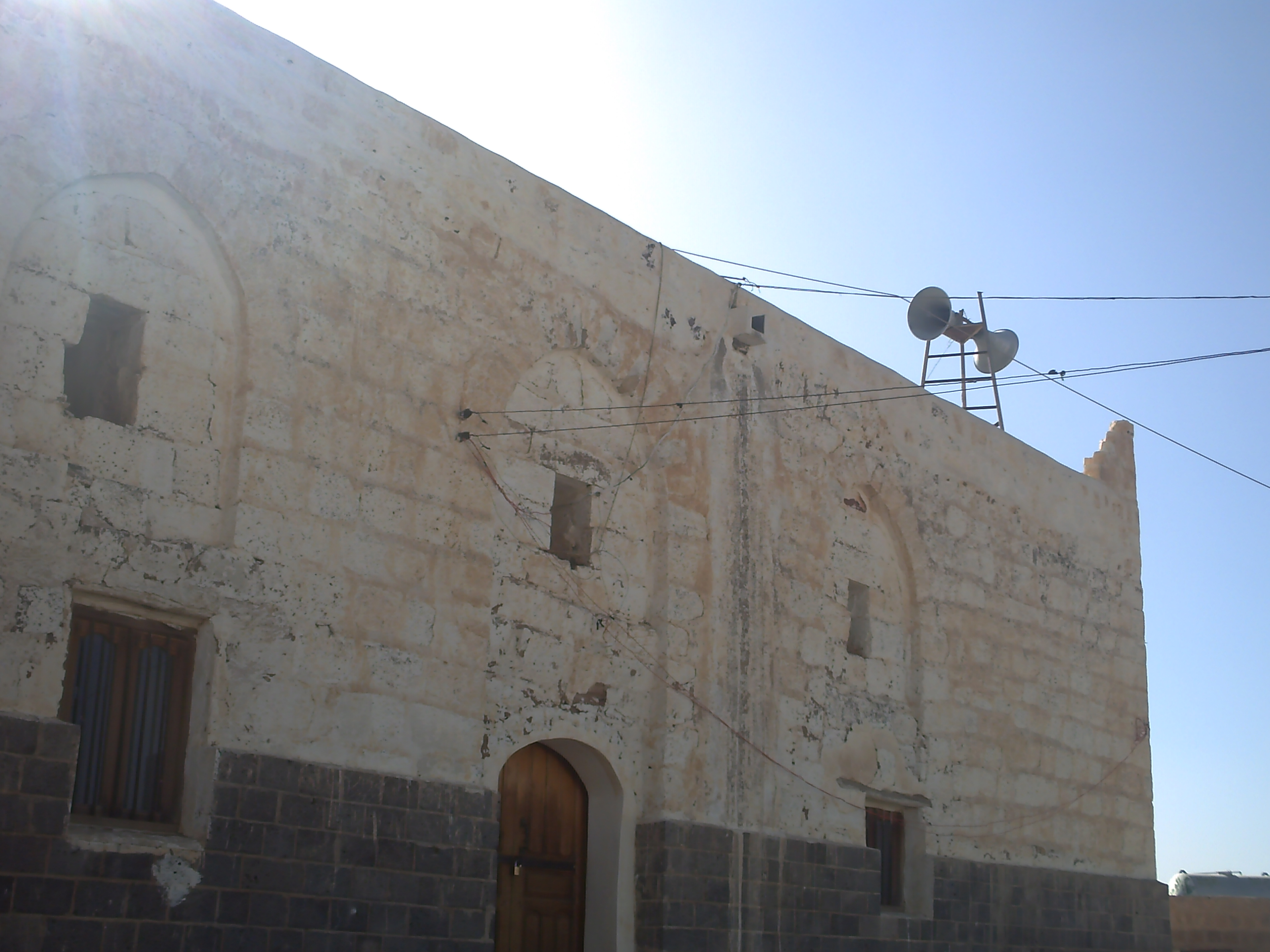
Mosque of Syedna Yusuf Najmuddin in Taibah, Yemen

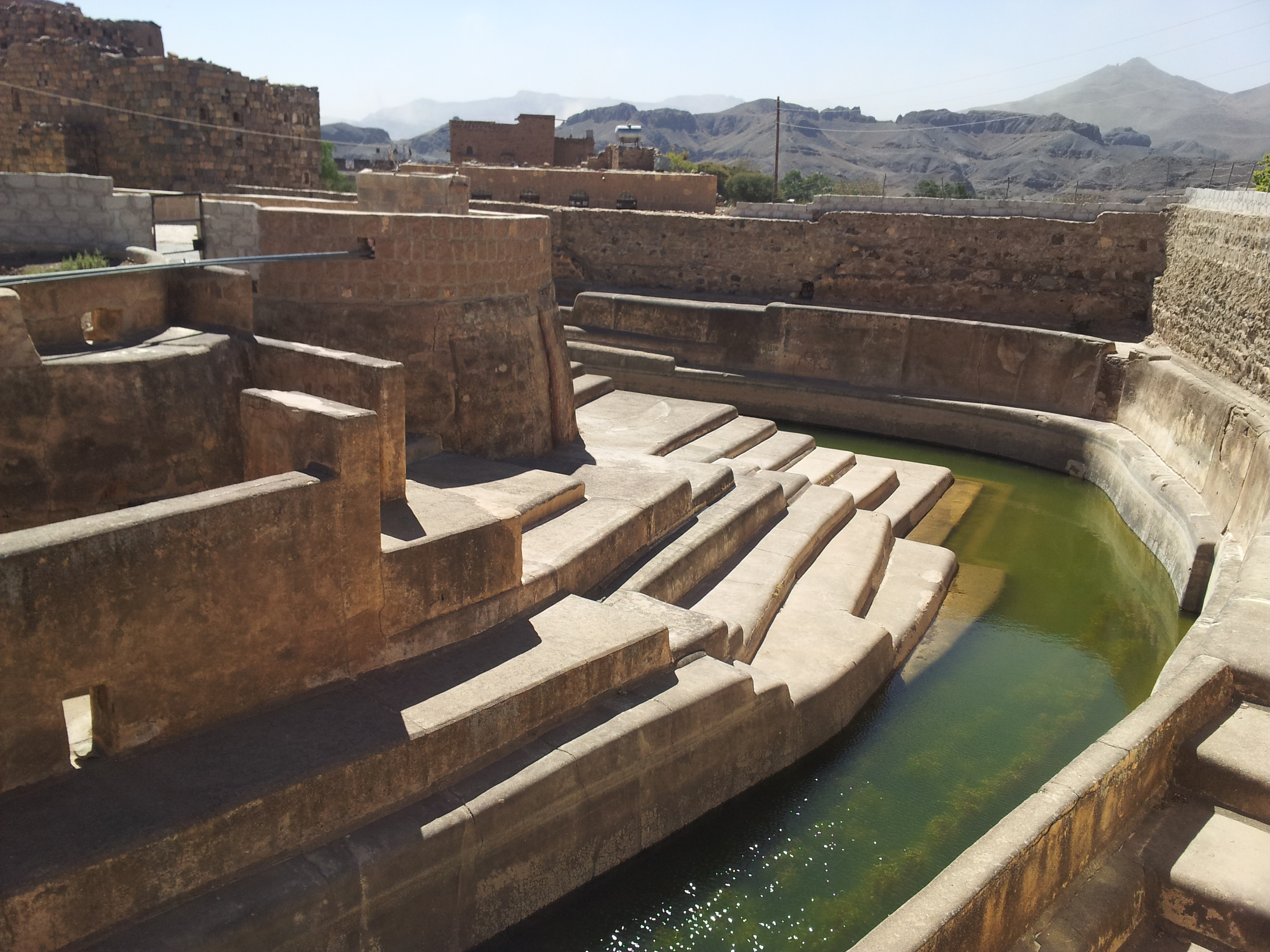
Water system built by Syedna Yusuf

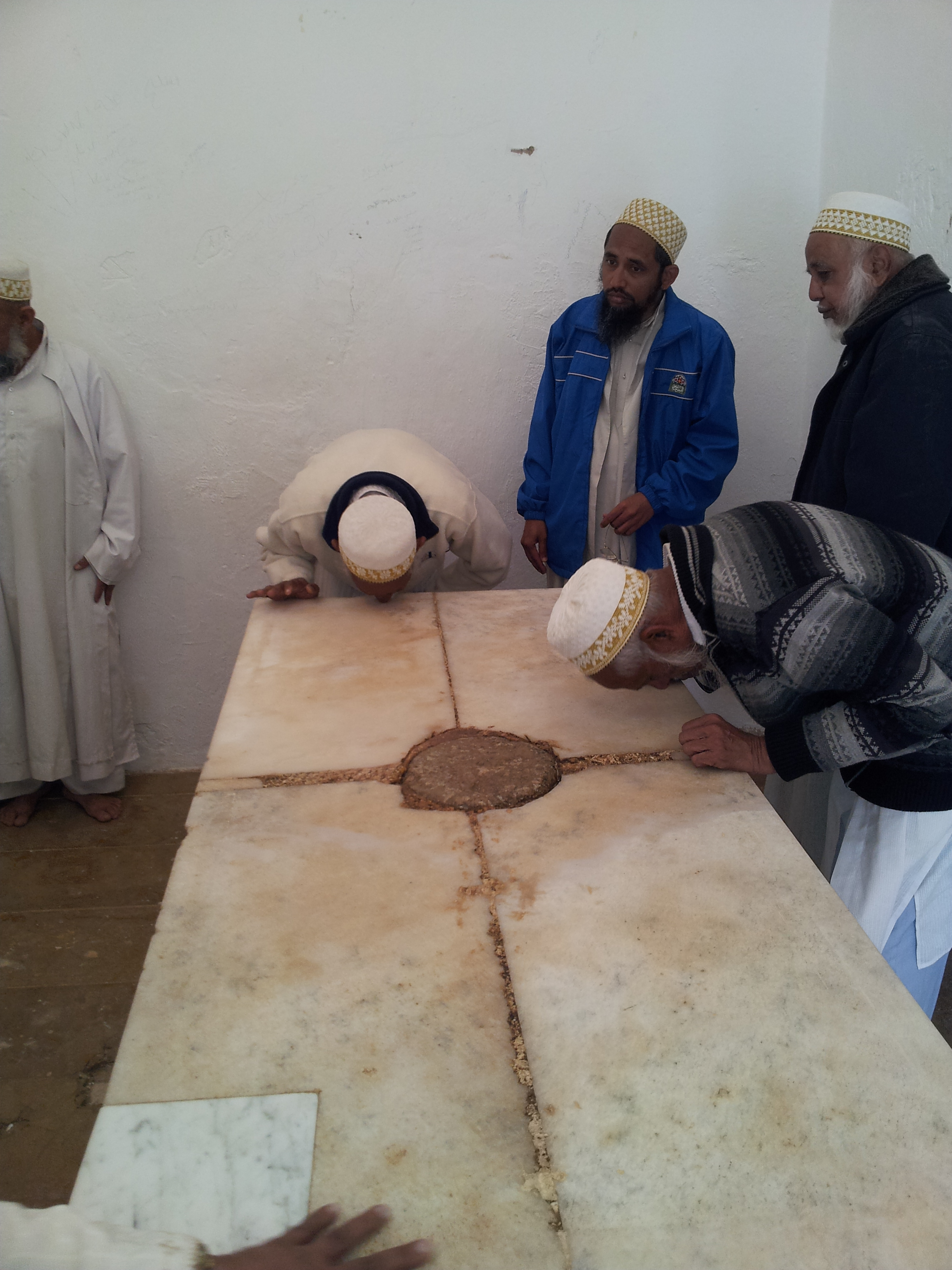
Tomb of Syedna Yusuf Najmuddin, Taibah, Yemen

Shia Islam titles
Yusuf Najmuddin I Dā'ī al-Mutlaq Died: 23 June 1567 CE / 16 Dhu al-Hijjah 974 AH, Taiba, Yemen
Preceded by Mohammad Ezzuddin	24th Dā'ī al-Mutlaq; 946–974 AH/ 1539–1567 AD	Succeeded by Jalal Shamshuddin bin Hasan
