= Burhanpur Dargah case =

Burhanpur Dargah case was filed to resolve the dispute arisen due to right to the use of certain waqf property belonging to Dawoodi Bohra, situated in Burhanpur, India.

The 46th Dai-ul-Mutlaq, Syedna Mohammed Badruddin, and his predecessors Dais were appointed by valid ‘nass’ but on his death a controversy arose between members of the Dawoodi Bohras community as to whether or not "Badruddin appointed a successor by ‘Nas-e-Jali’ (a sort of declaration). Dispute between the parties to this particular property case arose on the point that a true Dai-ul-Mutlaq can only be a custodian of the property.

The case was filed in 1925, by Mahomed bhai and Taib ali. They died during course of time and new appellant were applied to attend the case. After years together when the hearing before their Lordships began in Privy Council, the appellant were Hasanali Jaffarji and Tahir bhai. They stated in evidence that they do not regard the defendant as truly appointed Dai-ul-Mutlaq.

After due deliberations, the main question left to be decided by counsel in the case was whether respondent is a Dai-ul-Mutlaq. The council finally came to the conclusion that ‘there is ample evidence upon which the fact of "Nas" can be inferred’ and, therefore, agreed that respondent 51st Dai Syedna Taher Saifuddin ‘must be regarded as Dai-ul-Mutlaq’.

There was a similar case known as Chandabhoy Galla Case (filed in 1917AD) in which position of Dai-ul-mutlaq got further ascertained. In the court of Mughal emperor Jalaluddin Akbar also, Sulayman ibn Hasan challenged 27th Dai Syedna Dawood Bin Qutubshah's accession. After much deliberation, Akbar eventually issued a royal farman" in year 1591 AD, and a (lit. 'decree')" in favor of Dai Qutub Shah, instead. In another instance in 2014, succession of Mufaddal Saifuddin was contested by an opposing faction led by Khuzaima Qutbuddin, 51st Dai Syedna Taher Saifuddin's son, who moved the Bombay High Court to protract the case despite lack of mainstream recognition. On 23 April 2024, the Bombay high court dismissed the suit challenging Syedna Mufaddal Saifuddin's position as the 53rd Dai-al-Mutlaq of the Dawoodi Bohra Community. The court dismissed Taher Fakhruddin(son of Khuzaima Qutbuddin)'s claim and upheld Syedna Mufaddal as Dai-ul-Mutlaq.
