= Succession to the 52nd Dai al-Mutlaq =

Leadership dispute in the Dawoodi Bohras

The 52nd Da'i al-Mutlaq of the Dawoodi Bohras, Mohammed Burhanuddin died in January 2014. As per the tenets of the sect each predecessor is required to nominate his successor prior to his death. Following Burhanuddin's death, Syedna Mufaddal Saifuddin took up the office of Da'i al-Mutlaq, as per the appointment by Mohammed Burhanuddin. Khuzaima Qutubuddin claiming to have been appointed heir 50 years earlier in secrecy, challenged Mufaddal's right to be Dai in the Bombay High Court.

In 2024, the Bombay High Court ruled in favour of Syedna Mufaddal Saifuddin as Dawoodi Bohra community leader and dismissed the suit as the plaintiffs failed to provide evidence of their own claims.

Prior to the judgment, Mufaddal Saifuddin was largely accepted as the Bohras' leader by government and other public bodies. The UK Charity Commission has stated in writing, that "our view is that His Holiness Syedna Mufaddal Saifuddin is the current incumbent of the office of Dai al-Mutlaq."

== Overview ==
Prior to 2014, Mohammed Burhanuddin suffered a stroke in a London on 1 June 2011 and on 4 June 2011, Mufaddal Saifuddin was named his successor. Following this, Mufaddal Saifuddin assumed this role as the successor and his appointment was welcomed by the Dawoodi Bohra community. In the Dawoodi Bohra Mithaq (oath of allegiance), Mufaddal Saifuddin's name was taken alongside Mohammed Burhanuddin's. Together, Burhanuddin and Mufaddal Saifuddin traveled the globe looking after the affairs of the community up until 2014.

== Claims ==
=== Mufaddal Saifuddin's Position ===
Mufaddal Saifuddin's position is that he has been appointed a number of times in presence of multiple witnesses. These instances are:

- On 27 January 1969 (corresponding to the night of 11th Zil Qa'dah 1388 H) – in the presence of Sh Ibrahim Yamani, Sh Abdulhusain Tambawala & Sh Abdulhusein Sh Ibrahim Abdul Qadir, in Mumbai. This appointment is noted in a diary entry that was shown to the public on 4 February 2014 (4 Rabi al Akhar 1435H) by Mufaddal Saifuddin.
- On 24 October 1994 (corresponding to 20 Jumada al Ula 1415H) in the presence of Sh Abdulhusain Yamani, in Karachi.
- In October/November 2005, during the month of Ramadan 1426H, in the presence of Mohammed Burhanuddin's eldest son Qaidjoher Ezzuddin and Malek al Ashtar Shujauddin, in Bonham House, London.
- On 4 June 2011 (corresponding to 3 Rajab al-Asab 1432H) in Cromwell Hospital, London, in the presence of 6 witnesses.
- On 20 June 2011 (corresponding to 19th Rajab 1432H) in Raudat Tahera, Mumbai in the presence of thousands of community members. This video was live broadcast worldwide to the entire Dawoodi Bohra community.

For three years from 2011 to 2014 Mufaddal Saifuddin assumed the role of Burhanuddin's successor. In the Dawoodi Bohra Mithaq (oath of allegiance), Mufaddal Saifuddin's name was taken alongside Mohammed Burhanuddin's as the successor. Together, Mohammed Burhanuddin and Mufaddal Saifuddin traveled the globe looking after the affairs of the community up until Mohammed Burhanuddin's death in 2014. Henceforth, he assumed the role of the 53rd Da'i al-Mutlaq.

=== Khuzaima Qutbuddin's Claim ===
In 2011 up to 2014, Khuzaima Qutbuddin and his family had publicly declared and congratulated Mufaddal Saifuddin as the successor. On a few occasions, Khuzaima Qutbuddin was seen participating in public gatherings seated below Mufaddal Saifuddin. Until the Mohammed Burhanuddin's death, there wasn't any indication of objection from Khuzaima Qutbuddin.

Khuzaima Qutbuddin challenged this ascension and claimed that Mohammed Burhanuddin was too ill to have spoken coherently, and medically unfit to move or drink sherbet.

In reply to these allegations, an audio recording of the appointment, and a video recording of the Majlis in Cromwell Hospital was shown to the entire Dawoodi Bohra community on 18 May 2014 (corresponding to 19 Rajab al Asab 1435H). This video confirmed Mohammed Burhanuddin speaking coherently to his family, drinking sherbet and presiding over the Majlis, therefore affirming the events described by Qaidjoher Ezzuddin and the Alvazaratus Saifiyah document. Qutbuddin has not responded to this video.

Following Burhanuddin's death in January 2014, Khuzaima Qutbuddin, claimed the title of the 53rd Dā'ī l-Muṭlaq of the Dawoodi Bohras. Khuzaima Qutbuddin claims that Mohammed Burhanuddin performed nass on him 49 years ago in 1965 a ritual during which he appointed him as his successor in private without any witnesses. Qutbuddin states that Burhanuddin told him that this was because otherwise, 'swords would be crossed'.

The rift between the two claimants started to appear even before the death of Burhanuddin, with followers of Khuzaima Qutbuddin rallying support for Khuzaima. A group formed in 2013 in support of Burhanuddin's half-brother Khuzaima Qutbuddin, who was Mazoon, serving second under Dai al Mutlaq. Khuzaima has denied formation of any separate sect by publishing a public affidavit.

Khuzaima Qutbuddin died on 30 March 2016. On 31 March 2016 the family of Khuzaima Qutbuddin released a statement that Khuzaima Qutbuddin had conferred nass (announcement of successor) on his son Taher Fakhruddin.

== Chronological Account of the events in 2011 ==
=== The Events of 4 June 2011 ===
On 4 June 2011 (corresponding to 3 Rajab al-Asab 1432H), Mohammed Burhanuddin gathered three of his sons (commonly referred to as Shehzadas), namely Qusai, Idris and Ammar; his daughter Husaina; son in law Dr Moiz, and grandson Abdul Qadir Nooruddin to his room at Cromwell Hospital. He made a declaration appointing his son Mufaddal Saifuddin as his successor, and instructed them to inform the Dawoodi Bohra community. Mohammed Burhanuddin then summoned Mufaddal Saifuddin and his eldest son Qaidjoher Ezzuddin to Cromwell Hospital, where a short Majlis was held in Cromwell Hospital, Mohammed Burhanuddin was congratulated on his appointment, drank sherbet and everyone present performed salaam to Mohammed Burhanuddin and Mufaddal Saifuddin.

These sequence of events were cited in a Majlis held by Qaidjoher Ezzuddin in al Masjid ul Husseini in Northolt; London on 5 June 2011. The video of this Majlis was recorded and was broadcast to the Dawoodi Bohra community centers worldwide on 6 June 2011. These events were also documented in an official report (Arabic: مثال) by the office of His Holiness, Alvazaratus Saifiyah. This document was published and distributed to entire Dawoodi Bohra community during the month of Ramadan in 2011. Khuzaima Qutbuddin is said to have congratulated Mufaddal Saifuddin on his appointment as successor.

==== Mohammed Burhanuddin's Medical Condition ====
At the time of Mohammed Burhanuddin's stroke his sons, attendant physician and son-in-law, Dr Moiz bhaisaheb and surviving daughter were present in London with him along with other close family members. Neither Qutbuddin nor his family were present before or subsequently.

The medical report presented by Khuzaima Qutbuddin explicitly ruled out the possibility of the Mohammed Burhanuddin having any ability to coherently speak or move. The review was done by Dr Daniel Mankens, chairman of Neurology Beaumont Hospital, Michigan. Based on this review report, Qutbuddin claimed that 'the succession was not done in London Hospital' as Mohammad Burhanuddin suffered from a 'full stroke at the age of 100 that made it difficult for him to write, speak, or move'.

The doctors behind these reports had never met nor treated Mohammed Burhanuddin at any time and gave their opinions based on medical reports and the explanations provided by Khuzaima Qutbuddin.

Meanwhile, the specialists who actually treated, attended to Mohammed Burhanuddin and who wrote the medical reports do not agree with these opinions. Dr John Francis Costello; Consultant in Respiratory Medicine, and Neurologist Dr Omar Malik, both of whom had attended to Mohammed Burhanuddin at Cromwell Hospital in London have stated, in writing, that His Holiness was capable of making the declaration and of conducting a ceremony, even though his speech was slurred. Further, Dr Costello stated that he believes the report provided by the USA doctor Dr Daniel Menkes is incorrect. He confirmed that his patient, Mohammed Burhanuddin indeed did communicate his wishes on a variety of issues during his admission.

On 4 June, the day of the Nass in question, Dr Costello noted that there was evidence of continued improvement in Mohammed Burhanuddin's health. He confirmed that although he did not witness the said Nass, there was no doubt that Mohammed Burhanuddin was able to effectively communicate his wishes whilst at Cromwell Hospital, particularly in his mother tongue Lisan al-Dawat.

In regards to His Holiness's intellectual state, both Dr Costello and Dr Malik confirmed that he was of sound cognitive state, and that he was able to clearly communicate with his family and medical staff. In regards to the reports by the U.S. doctors, Dr Omar denied there was any evidence of a receptive speech problem. Dr Costello further expressed that he felt a special connection with His Holiness as he often greeted him with a smile of recognition, looked him in the eye, interacted in English, and even become lively at times.

A year later in 2012, Dr Costello was invited on stage to meet Mohammed Burhanuddin. In his medical report he notes that Burhanuddin instantly smiled at him with recognition, and shook his hand for a lengthy time.

These reports were submitted in court in the sworn affidavit submitted by Shehzada Qaidjoher Ezzuddin, the eldest son of Mohammed Burhanuddin before the Bombay High Court.

=== The Raudat Tahera Ceremony ===
On 8 June 2011, Dr John Francis Costello noted improvements in His Holiness's health and there were discussions about his wishes to travel to Mumbai for to attend the death anniversary of his father Taher Saifuddin which was to be held on 20 June 2011. By 15 June 2011, there was further improvement. Dr John Francis Costello approved of sending His Holiness to Mumbai in an air ambulance as it was deemed safe and appropriate. On this day, Dr Costello recalls having a short coherent conversation in English with His Holiness about his journey to Mumbai. On 17 June 2011, His Holiness was discharged from Cromwell Hospital and traveled to Mumbai, as planned, in an air ambulance. These sequence of events, His Holiness's wishes to travel and the doctor's approval are of paramount significance because the group loyal to Qutbuddin allege that His Holiness was forced to travel against his own will despite suffering a stroke. Dr Costello's letter proves otherwise.

A ceremony was arranged in Raudat Tahera Mumbai on 20 June 2011 (corresponding to 19th Rajab 1432H) to declare Mufaddal Saifuddin as the Dā'ī. The entire ceremony was recorded and was broadcast on the same day to Dawoodi Bohra community centers worldwide. This video was posted by Qutbuddin's website and re-posted by another YouTube user. Images of this ceremony are also available online.

== Events following the succession (2011–2014) ==
=== Mohammed Burhanuddin's activities after the succession ===
From 2011 up to 2014, Mohammed Burhanuddin, despite his stroke, went on pilgrimages, traveled across India, overseas, and presided over many community gatherings.

In 1432H, He presided over the Eid al-Fitr Majlis with Mufaddal Saifuddin seated besides him. Following the Ramadan of 2011 (1432H), Mohammed Burhanuddin went on a pilgrimage to Karbala, Najaf and Cairo.

In the Hijri year of 1433H (November 2011), Mohammed Burhanuddin held the Muharram gatherings in Mumbai. On 2 Muharram Mohammed Burhanuddin conducted the first sermon, and presided over every Majlis at night until Ashura of 1432H. Following this, he traveled to Galiakot to the on a pilgrimage to the mausoleum of Fakhruddin Shaheed. There he performed the opening of the new Mosque of Partapur, Rajasthan on 28 Muharram 1433. In the month of Safar he went on a pilgrimage to Hasanpeer. There, on 4 Safar he performed the opening of the new Masjid in Rampura and named it Mohammedi Masjid. He then traveled to Ahmedabad for Chehlum, where Mufaddal Saifuddin presided over the sermons. During this visit, his son Huzaifa Mohyuddin died in Ahmedabad, and the funeral rites were carried out by Mohammed Burhanuddin and Mufaddal Saifuddin. On 18 January 2012, Narendra Modi visited Burhanuddin in Ahmedabad to offer his condolences. On 20 January 2012, (26 Safar 1433H), he laid the foundation of the Qutbi Mazaar Development Project in Ahmedabad. He then visited Dongam on 27 Safar 1433H.

On 6 Rabi' al-awwal 1433H, he traveled to Pune where he was welcomed by a large gathering. On the 10th of Rabi' al-awwal the Chief Minister of Madhya Pradesh Shivraj Singh Chouhan met Burhanuddin and expressed their condolences on the death of Shahzada Huzaifa Mohiyuddin. On 4 February 2012, on the Mawlid day in Pune, her presided over the Majlis seated above Mufaddal Saifuddin for 3 hours, listening to his entire sermon. On 4 Rabi' al-thani, he presided over the Mawlid Majlis in Saifee Masjid Mumbai, as Mufaddal Saifuddin conducted the sermons seated besides him.

On 12 March 2012, on the eve of Burhanuddin's 101st birthday, he presided over the birthday celebrations and procession with Narendra Modi seated besides him. The following day, he presided over the Majlis while Mufaddal Saifuddin conducted the sermons seated besides him. In 1433H (August 2012) Mohammed Burhanuddin presided over the Eid al-Fitr Majlis with Mufaddal Saifuddin seated besides him.

On 19 June 2012 (30 Rajab 1433H), Mohammed Burhanuddin traveled to London. On 11 Sha'ban 1433H (30 June 2012), Asif Ali Zardari visited him at Masjid ul Husseini London. In a public congregation at Masjid ul Husseini London on 14 July 2012, Dr Costello was invited on stage to meet Mohammed Burhanuddin. In his medical report he notes that he instantly smiled at him with recognition, and shook his hand for a lengthy time.

In the Hijri year of 1434H (November 2012), Mohammed Burhanuddin held the Muharram gatherings in Surat. On 27 November 2012 (14 Moharram 1434H), he held the Nikah ceremony of community members in the Rasme Saify ceremony in Surat. In Mumbai, on 27 May 2013 (18 Rajab 1434H) he presided over the death anniversary of Taher Saifuddin and the final day examinations of Al Jamea tus Saifiyah.

In the Hijri year of 1435H (November 2013), Mohammed Burhanuddin held the Muharram gatherings in Mumbai. For 10 days, Mufaddal Saifuddin conducted the sermons during the day, and Burhanuddin would preside over the Majlis at night. On the day of Ashura Burhanuddin presided over the sermons conducted by Mufaddal Saifuddin.

On 12 January 2014, he presided over the Majlis of the Mawlid in Raudat Tahera, Mumbai. This was his last public gathering before his death five days later on 17 January 2014.

=== Mufaddal Saifuddin's activities after the succession ===
Mufaddal Saifuddin assumed this role as the successor of Mohammed Burhanuddin and his appointment was welcomed by the Dawoodi Bohra community. Together, Mohammed Burhanuddin and Mufaddal Saifuddin undertook the leadership after the affairs of the community.

On 9 June 2011, then Chief Minister of Gujarat, Narendra Modi congratulated Mufaddal Saifuddin on his succession. On 15 June 2011 the office of Mohammed Burhanuddin, The Alvazaratus Saifiyah instructed Dawoodi Bohras to take Mufaddal Saifuddin's name alongside Mohammed Burhanuddin's as the successor in their Mithaq (oath of allegiance).

A month later, in Sha'ban, Mufaddal Saifuddin led the examinations of Al Jamea tus Saifiyah on behalf of Mohammed Burhanuddin. During the month of Ramadan and Eid al-Fitr, Saifuddin led the community prayers and Mohammed Burhanuddin presided over the Eid al-Fitr Majlis with Mufaddal Saifuddin seated besides him. Following the Ramadan of 2011 (1432H), Mohammed Burhanuddin went on a pilgrimage to Karbala, Najaf and Cairo.

In the Hijri year of 1433H (November 2011), Mohammed Burhanuddin held the Muharram gatherings in Mumbai. On 2 Muharram Mohammed Burhanuddin conducted the first sermon and instructed Mufaddal Saifuddin to conduct the remaining nine sermons until Ashura seated besides him.

On 4 January 2012, on the Mawlid day in Pune, as his successor Mufaddal Saifuddin conducted the sermon on behalf of Mohammed Burhanuddin. Burhanuddin sat besides him for 3 hours listening to Saifuddin's entire sermon. On 12 March 2012, on the eve of Mohammed Burhanuddin's 101st birthday. Narendra Modi attended the birthday celebrations and procession besides Mohammed Burhanudin and Mufaddal Saifuddin. The following day, as the successor, Mufaddal Saifuddin conducted the sermons with Mohammed Burhanuddin seated on the stage besides him. On 4 Rabi' al-thani, he conducted the sermons of the Mawlid Majlis in Saifee Masjid Mumbai, with Mohammed Burhanuddin seated besides him. On 1 April 2012, he conducted the sermon and Majlis of Fatima Al Zahra on 10 Jumada al-awwal 1433H in Surat. On 9 Rajab 1433H (29 May 2012), he led annual examinations of Al Jamea tus Saifiyah on behalf of Mohammed Burhanuddin in Saify Mahal, Mumbai.

During the month of Ramadan 1433H (August 2012) and Eid al-Fitr, Saifuddin led the community prayers and Mohammed Burhanuddin presided over the Eid al-Fitr Majlis with Mufaddal Saifuddin seated besides him. Following that, Mohammed Burhanuddin appointed Mufaddal Saifuddin as the Amir al-hajj for the Hajj pilgrimage on 14 October 2012 (29 Zil Qadah 1433H).

In the Hijri year of 1434H (November 2012), Mohammed Burhanuddin held the Muharram gatherings in Surat. Mufaddal Saifuddin to conducted ten sermons until Ashura with Mohammed Burhanuddin seated besides him.

Mufaddal Saifuddin's first official correspondence as successor was in May 2013 during the celebration of Mohammed Burhanuddin's Golden Jubilee, in which he instructed the community to set out on religious pilgrimages. In the month of Rajab of 2013, he conducted the annual examinations of Al Jamea tus Saifiyah on behalf of Mohammed Burhanuddin.

In the Hijri year of 1435H (November 2013), Mohammed Burhanuddin held the Muharram gatherings in Mumbai. For 10 days, Mufaddal Saifuddin conducted the sermons during the day, and Mohammed Burhanuddin would preside over the Majlis at night. On the day of Ashura Mufaddal Saifuddin conducted the Ashura sermon seated besides Mohammed Burhanuddin.

On 23 December 2013, Mufaddal Saifuddin traveled to Udaipur to conduct the sermons of Chehlum 1435H. A video recording of this sermons was broadcast in community centers worldwide on 16 January 2014.

Khuzaima Qutbuddin and his family had even publicly declared and congratulated Mufaddal Saifuddin as the successor. On a few occasions, Khuzaima Qutbuddin was seen participating in public gatherings seated below Mufaddal Saifuddin. Until Mohammed Burhanuddin's death, there wasn't any indication of objection from Khuzaima Qutbuddin.

== Events following Mohammed Burhanuddin's death ==
Mohammed Burhanuddin died on 17 January 2014 ^{[1]} (corresponding to 16 Rabi al Awwal 1435H) in Mumbai, India.

Mufaddal Saifuddin, who had already been publicly appointed and accepted as the successor, assumed the position of the 53rd Da'i al-Mutlaq of the Dawoodi Bohra community. Saifuddin was in Colombo at the time and immediately traveled to Mumbai via Chennai. He conducted his first Jumu'ah Salah in Sri Lanka and arrived in Saify Mahal, Mumbai that evening to conduct and lead the Janaza and funeral rites. Khuzaima Qutbuddin, who at the time was already in Saify Mahal, Mumbai, left for his residence in Thane prior to Mufaddal Saifuddin's arrival. Mufaddal Saifuddin led the Janaza rites throughout the night. and thousands of mourners attended the funeral on Saturday 18 January 2014 led by Mufaddal Saifuddin.

On the morning of Saturday 18 January, as the Janaza left Saify Mahal en route to Raudat Tahera for burial, Khuzaima Qutbuddin sent out an email campaign to Dawoodi Bohra Community members attaching a PDF letter addressed to Mufaddal Saifuddin stating his claim. That evening, around 36 hours after Mohammed Burhanuddin's death, Qutbuddin posted a YouTube video of himself on his website claiming that he was the 53rd Da'i al-Mutlaq, having been appointed in total secrecy in 1965.

On 20 January 2014, Khuzaima Qutbuddin's name was removed Dawoodi Bohra from all official community records as the Mazoon.

On 30 January 2014, thousands of Dawoodi Bohras gathered at Azad Maidan, Mumbai in support of Mufaddal Saifuddin as the 53rd Da'i al-Mutlaq, pledged their allegiance to him and dissociated from the breakaway faction formed by Khuzaima Qutbuddin. Mufaddal's elder brother Qaidjoher Ezzuddin stated that "nass was performed on Mufaddal not once but a number of times". Similarly peace marches were organised in community centers worldwide where resolutions were signed handed over to Government officials. A number of prominent personalities offered their condolences to Mufaddal Saifuddin as Mohammed Burhanuddin's son and successor.

In April 2014, Khuzaima Qutbuddin filed action in the Mumbai High Court against the succession of Mufaddal Saifuddin.

== Support for the claimants ==
=== Saifuddin ===
- Mohammed Burhanuddin died in January 2014. Mufaddal Saifuddin led the last rituals in which hundreds of thousands of Bohras joined. It is reported that hundreds of thousands of Dawoodi Bohras' standing gave an "indication of who they have believed to be their 53rd Dā'ī al-Muṭlaq". Indian Express further reports that "Many Bohras have accepted Burhanuddin's second son Syedi Mufaddal Saifuddin as Syedna".
- Around 90% majority of the community support Mufaddal Saifuddin as the rightful leader of 2.5 million Dawoodi Bohras living in 100 countries.
- The Indian foreign minister, Salman Khurshid, on 28 Rabi' al-thani 1435 AH (28 February 2014 CE) arrived to offer condolences to Mufaddal Saifuddin at Burhanuddin's residence Saifee Mahal, Mumbai. It is reported that he presented a letter of good wishes from Sonia Gandhi as Saifuddin left for his first trip abroad, after "accession to the.. Dā'ī office".
- A number of prominent personalities offered their condolences to Mufaddal Saifuddin as Mohammed Burhanuddin's son and successor.
- Around 50,000 followers of Mufaddal Saifuddin gathered at a public ground in Mumbai to "endorse their solidarity and offer their condolences" to their "new spiritual leader". According to the official association handling the affairs of Dawoodi Bohras in Mumbai, Qutbuddin's "wrongful claim" has aggrieved community members, as they had witnessed "nass" in 2011 in Mumbai which "had [been] reaffirmed … on many occasions".
- Followers of Mufaddal Saifuddin staged peace marches and submitted a memos protesting his half brother's claim in Bhopal, Surat, and 'in various parts of the country'.

=== Qutbuddin ===
- The former Chief Justice of India, AM Ahmadi, in his personal stand, accepted Khuzaima Qutbuddin as the rightful successor. As per report, Ahmadi also said that he "examined the documents and believe that Qutbuddin's stand of the 53rd Dā'ī is principled" in his opinion.
- Abdeali Qutbuddin, son of Khuzaima Qutbuddin, claimed that they have around 450,000 (450,000) followers.
- Other sources state that his support ranges from as much as 500 people.
- The faction supporting Mufaddal Saifuddin as the Dā'ī, has excommunicated Qutbuddin and his followers. However, there is no official confirmation from the community on the alleged ex-communication while the progressive members have called a ban on this practice citing it illegal.

=== Un-decided ===
The Progressive Dawoodi Bohra took a neutral stance in wake of the succession controversy. The Progressives' Central Board warned the claimants that they would be "consigned to the dustbins of history" if they do not adapt and act more fairly. Several community members interviewed welcomed the court action.

The Times of India reported that "most Dawoodi Bohra back Burhanuddin's second son, Mufadda Saifuddin, and hold him as its 53rd spiritual leader". There were reports that some Bohras who support Qutbuddin have been forced to swear allegiance to Saifuddin through social isolation and threats of divorce between married couples. A cover story on the Bohra survey revealed that most Bohras (46%) support Khuzaima over Mufaddal and many are in the community due to fear and force Disquiet among Bohras However, the neutrality of this survey poll has been disputed citing reasons that it was carried out by an anonymous group, where the majority of the respondents were not Bohras, and it did not get any statistics from the Dawoodi Bohra head office in Mumbai. The survey was carried out by 399 respondents (0.0004% of community) from which a majority of respondents did not belong to the Dawoodi Bohra community, thus questioning the bias and validity of the report. Further, the article that was published in the Hindustan Times and the Mumbai Mirror had contradictory results with glaring dissimilarities among poll statistics, whereas the same media outlets had previously published that hundreds of thousands had gathered in support of Mufaddal Saifuddin, once again questioning the validity of the survey.

== Historical significance ==
The issue is also historic in the sense that similar case was put up in the court of Mughal emperor Akbar, in year 1591AD, where succession was challenged. There is also a unique case (Chandabhoy Galla Case) filed in the British time court in Mumbai, in 1917 and decided in 1921, where claim was based on modality of succession earlier done. In both of these cases the challenger was defeated, Dawood Bin Qutub remained Dai in 1591AD and, ownership of the Chandabhoy Galla remained with Taher Saifuddin.

== Court cases ==
In January 2014, Qutbuddin published a public affidavit on his website declaring his position and legal status of properties, claiming to be the sole trustee of all the trusts in the Dawoodi Bohra community. Qutbuddin filed petitions against Saifuddin concerning the succession controversy in Bombay High court and Gujrat High Court. Khuzaima published a public affidavit on his website declaring his position and legal status of properties

=== UK Charity Commission ===
In May 2014, Khuzaima Qutbuddin approached the UK Charity Commission claiming that there was no valid appointee as the Da'i al-Mutlaq. On 15 August 2014, the UK Charity Commission altered their position in favour of Mufaddal Saifuddin. The commission established that there is someone in office, albeit that their position is being challenged. They also stated in writing, that "our view is therefore that His Holiness Syedna Mufaddal Saifuddin is the current incumbent of the office of Dai al-Mutlaq." They further stated that Mufaddal Saifuddin can continue to administer the Charity until the outcome of the Bombay High Court case is known.

=== Bombay High Court Suit No. 337 of 2014 ===
The late Mohammed Burhanuddin's half-brother Qutbuddin went to the High Court claiming the position of 53rd and to restrict Saifuddin from discharging the duties as the 53rd Dā'ī. The petition called for the High Court to have Qutbuddin, the half-brother, legally declared as the 53rd Dā'ī al-Mutlaq of the Bohra community, while simultaneously preventing his nephew, Mufaddal Saifuddin, from acting as the Dā'ī.

The Bombay high court on 12 April 2023 concluded the hearing and reserved its verdict in the dispute. On 23 April 2024, the Bombay high court dismissed Taher Fakhruddin's claim. The Bombay High Court's judgment hinged on the evidence presented. Khuzaima Qutbuddin's claim lacked sufficient corroborative evidence and relied on personal recollections, while Syedna Mufaddal Saifuddin's claim was supported by public declarations, witness testimonies, and documentation. The court emphasized the need for verifiable proof in religious succession disputes and examined the validity of nass within a legal context, particularly distinguishing between private and public declarations. The Plaintiff's case was dismissed due to the insufficiency of evidence.

=== Gujarat High Court case ===
The Gujarat High Court issued an interim order on 16 April 2014 prohibiting Saifuddin from acting as the 53rd Dā'ī and his supporters from dealing with the trust properties. Khuzaima filed eight writ petitions before Gujarat High Court pertaining to the succession controversy. This order was rescinded to allow Mufaddal Saifuddin full control over and use of all properties in Gujarat, provided that as the sole trustee, nothing is done to degenerate the value of the trust, effectively allowing him to operate as the 53rd Dai, but without granting such recognition. This situation was to remain pending the outcome of the Bombay High Court.

On 5 May 2024, in view of the judgment and order dated 23.4.2024 by the Bombay High Court, the Gujarat High Court disposed off this case, "as the principal issue of succession of Syedna Mohammad Burhanuddin, leader of the Dawoodi Bohra Community, has been set at rest with the decision of the Bombay High Court."

=== Appeal in the High Court of Bombay ===
Taher Fakhruddin appealed the judgement on 10 July 2024 as Appeal Case No.139 of 2024 in Suit No.337 of 2014.
