= Taher Fakhruddin =

54th Da'i of the Qutbi Bohras

- Born: 21 July 1968 (age 58); Mumbai, India
- Organization: Qutbi Bohra
- Style: His Holiness (by his followers) and Dawedaar or Claimant (by the followers of Syedna Mufaddal Saifuddin)
- Predecessor: Khuzaima Qutbuddin
- Spouse: Insiyah
- Children: 4
- Parents: Khuzaima Qutbuddin (father); Sakina Qutbuddin (mother)
- Relatives: Taher Saifuddin (grandfather); Mohammed Burhanuddin (uncle); Tahera Qutbuddin (sister)
- Website: fatemidawat.com

Taher Fakhruddin is the 54th Da'i al-Mutlaq of the Qutbi Bohras, a sect within Shia Islam distinguished as the Shia Fatimi Ismaili Tayyibi Qutbi Bohras. He is the son of Khuzaima Qutbuddin, the 53rd Da'i al-Mutlaq of the group. After the death of the 52nd Da'i al-Mutlaq, Mohammed Burhanuddin, two persons asserted their right to succeed him, Khuzaima Qutbuddin and Mufaddal Saifuddin. Followers of Khuzaima Qutbuddin regard Taher Fakhruddin as his successor, while Dawoodi Bohras view Mufaddal Saifuddin as the true Da'i.

== Religious Leadership and Nass ==
Fakhruddin leads the Qutbi Bohra community from his headquarters in Thane, near Mumbai, India. He is recognized by his followers as the spiritual and temporal leader of their community, with authority derived from the Shia concept of "Nass" (spiritual designation) by his predecessor.

=== Historical Context ===
Nass refers to the appointment of a successor, who is integral to the faith's continuity. Community history shows that there is no rigid method for conferring Nass. The key requirement is that the incumbent leader must communicate the nass, there must be a positive statement or indication. The method of Nass for appointing the next Dai al-Mutlaq mirrors that of the Imams; however, in the case of a Da'i al-Mutlaq, the successor is not required to be the consanguineous son of the appointer.

=== Public or Private Communication ===
Doctrinally, Nass is a manifestation of Allah's will. It can be declared openly and publicly, communicated privately or it can be documented in authenticated written form by the appointer. External validators (such as witnesses) are not required to testify to the Nass because the Imam's authority and decision-making power is not dependent on external validation. The Imam's infallibility precludes the need for fallible witnesses to confirm or validate his choice: it would be contradictory for the appointment of an infallible Imam to be subject to the testimony or approval of fallible witnesses.

Examples: Nass by private communication include the 12th Imam privately conferring Nass on the 13th Imam, and the 20th Imam conferring Nass in written form via a letter (Sijill ul-Bisharah) to Hurrat al-Malika, a single woman, declaring her the witness to the appointment of the 21st Imam.

=== Irrevocability of Nass ===
Once conferred, Nass is final and irrevocable. This aligns with the Fatemid belief system which asserts that the Nass signifies the will of Allah, communicated to the Imam, and cannot be altered or revoked. The appointment is guided by the Imam’s inspiration (ta'yeed), ensuring the appointee aligns with divine preordination, and therefore, it is considered perfect and beyond human interference or improvement.

== Beliefs and Teachings ==
Fakhruddin's teachings emphasize living life in accordance with the teachings of Ahl al-Bayt including:

1. Seeking knowledge and practicing good deeds
2. Striving for spiritual and material progress in one's own life
3. Living a life of gratitude and the importance of intellectual pursuits
4. Preservation of Fatimid philosophy, heritage and traditions
5. Gender equality, interfaith harmony and coexistence

Fakhruddin advocates for a progressive interpretation of Islam that balances traditional values with modern education and scientific advancement. He teaches that the essence of being a Muslim is to follow the middle path which is in effect, the 'straight path' towards Allah almighty.

== Mazar-e-Qutbi ==
The Mazaar-e-Qutbi is a religious complex built by Fakhruddin and located in Thane, India, situated near the Sanjay Gandhi National Park. The centerpiece of the complex is Raudat-un-Noor, a mausoleum built in honour of Syedna Khuzaima Qutbuddin RA, in which the entire Quran is engraved in gold on its inside marble walls, creating a stunning visual representation of Islamic scripture.

The complex also includes a Community Hall and serves multiple purposes beyond being a place of reverence and prayer. The adjoining Social Welfare Center is open to all, regardless of caste or creed, providing three free meals a day, services such as women's vocational training classes and children's tuition classes.

== Controversy ==
The succession to the position of Dā'ī al-Muṭlaq has been disputed since 2014, leading to a split in the Dawoodi Bohra community. Fakhruddin's claim is challenged by Mufaddal Saifuddin, who is recognized as the leader by a larger portion of the community. The Bombay High Court on 23rd April 2024 dismissed Taher Fakhruddin's lawsuit, directing that Mufaddal Saifuddin is the leader of the Dawoodi Bohra community. Taher Fakhruddin has appealed the judgement.

The Appeal is being heard by a Division Bench of the Bombay High Court. At the time of admitting and expediting the appeal on December 17, 2024, objections were raised by the Respondent that innocent or impressionable members of the Dawoodi Bohra community might be confused by the Appellant’s claims. In response to these objections, the court directed that during the pendency of the appeal, the Appellant must refrain from publicly stating that he is the "54th Dai al-Mutlaq of the Qutbi Bohra Community worldwide". The court also directed and clarified that while specific restrictions applied solely to the Appellant as an individual, the Appellant’s followers and others remain free to express their own views and that certain qualifying wording should be added to the website and social media platforms of the Appellant.

== Public engagement ==
Fakhruddin regularly delivers sermons and publishes religious texts for his followers. In his regular Majalis al-Hikma (Sessions of Wisdom) series, he addresses topical questions and provides contemporary guidance to his community in three languages: English, Lisaan ud-Da'wat and Arabic.

Fakhruddin has also engaged in interfaith dialogue and participated in academic discussions on Islamic history and theology.

Fakhruddin has also travelled to perform Umrah in 2025 and visited Fatimid Cairo in 2026 to perform ziyarat of Ras'ul Hussain.
