= Khuzaima Qutbuddin =

Claimant to the position of 53rd Dai-al-Mutlaq (1940–2016)

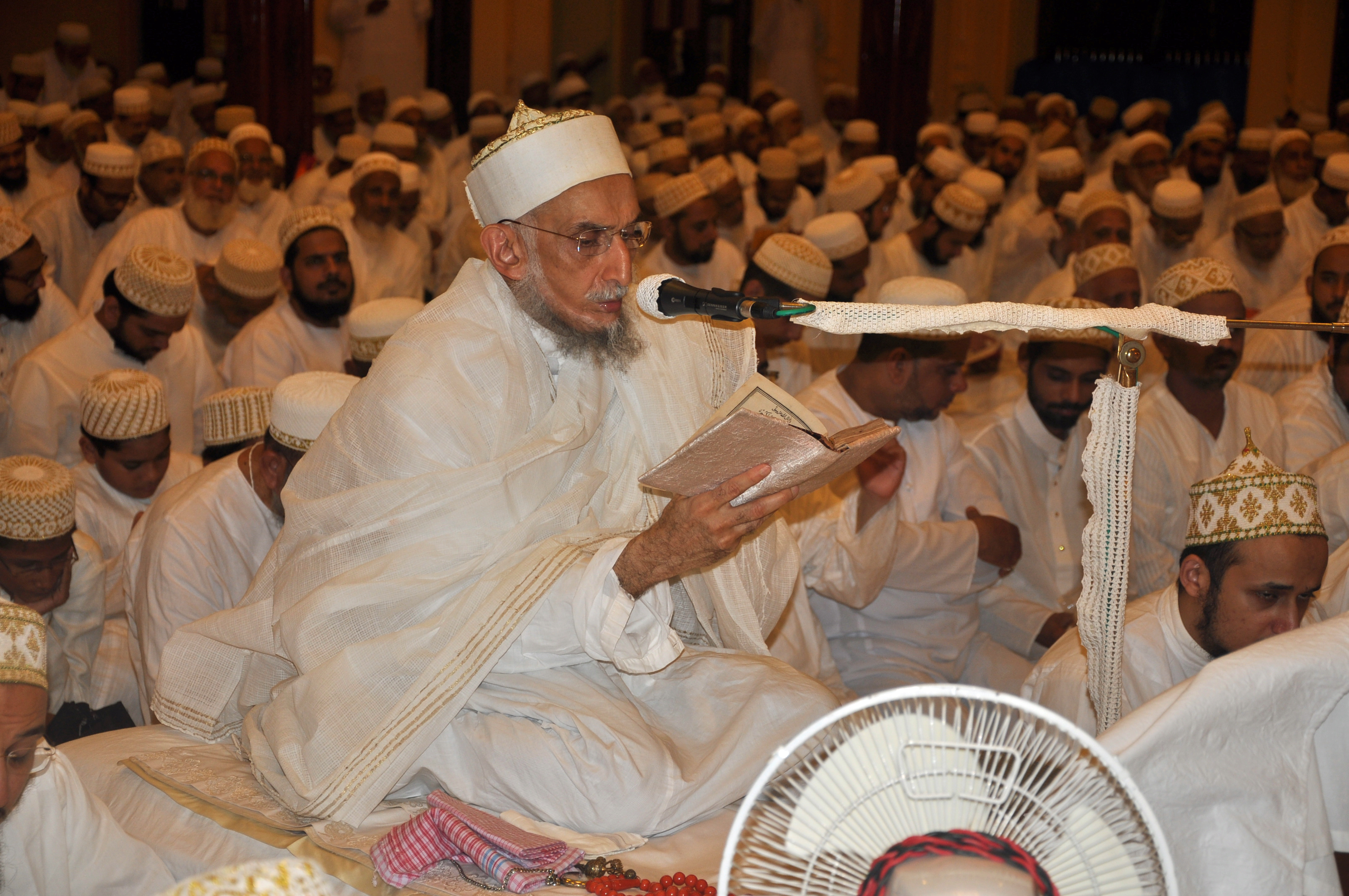
- Khuzaima Qutbuddin leading prayers at Saifee Masjid, Mumbai on 21 August 2011, corresponding to the night of 23rd Ramadan 1432AH, on Laylat al-Qadr
- Born: 5 June 1940; Mumbai, British India
- Died: 30 March 2016 (aged 75); Bakersfield, U.S.
- Citizenship: Indian
- Organization: Qutbi Bohra
- Title: False Da'i al-Mutlaq (Dawedaar)
- Successor: Taher Fakhruddin
- Parent(s): Taher Saifuddin; Aamena Aaisaheba
- Website: fatemidawat.com

Abu Taher Khuzaima Qutbuddin (5 June 1940 – 30 March 2016) was the son of the 51st Da'i al-Mutlaq, half brother of the 52nd Da'i and a Mazoon of the Dawoodi Bohras, a subgroup within the Mustaali, Ismaili Shia branch of Islam. Qutbuddin was appointed as Mazoon by the Da'i al-Mutlaq, Muhammad Burhanuddin in 1965.

Qutbuddin, a half-brother of Syedna Mohammed Burhanuddin and a rival claimant to the title of Dai-al-Mutlaq, claimed that his half-brother appointed him heir in 1965 while conferring on him the title of "mazoon". Contrary to the claim, Mufaddal Saifuddin son of late Burhanuddin claimed that his father had declared "nass" (succession) on him in London on 4 June 2011, and many times before. On 23 April 2024, the Bombay high court dismissed the suit challenging Mufaddal Saifuddin's position as the 53rd Dai-al-Mutlaq of the Dawoodi Bohra Community. The court dismissed the claim by Taher Fakhruddin (son of Khuzaima Qutbuddin) and upheld Mufaddal as Dai-ul-Mutlaq.

== Personal life ==
He is eleventh son of the 51st Da'i al-Mutlaq Taher Saifuddin. Qutbuddin died on 30 March 2016 in California.

== See also ==
- Ismailism
- Fatimid
