= Mithaq =

Mithaq or Misaq (Urdu: میثاق) is an Arabic, Persian and Urdu word meaning covenant.

== Misaq in Fatimid tradition ==
The Misaq or Mithaq, in Fatimid tradition, is considered a rite of passage from childhood to adulthood. Similar to a bar mitzvah, followers must be a certain age before taking the oath.

== Mithaq of Alastu (Covenant of Alastu) ==
The "Covenant of Alastu," or Mithaq of Alastu, is a concept in Islam referring to a primordial agreement made between God and all of humanity, where people testified that God is their Lord. This universal, pre-corporeal covenant is understood to bind believers to God and provide a deep spiritual foundation for their religious lives, as reflected in verses of the Quran like Al-Aʿrāf (7):172.

The Arabic word "mithaq" or "ahd" means a covenant or pact. Comes from the phrase "Alastu bi-Rabbikum?" which means "Am I not your Lord?" in the Quran.
