= Dawoodi Bohra =

Sect of Ismaili Shia Islam

Dawoodi Bohra; داؤوْدِي بُهرة
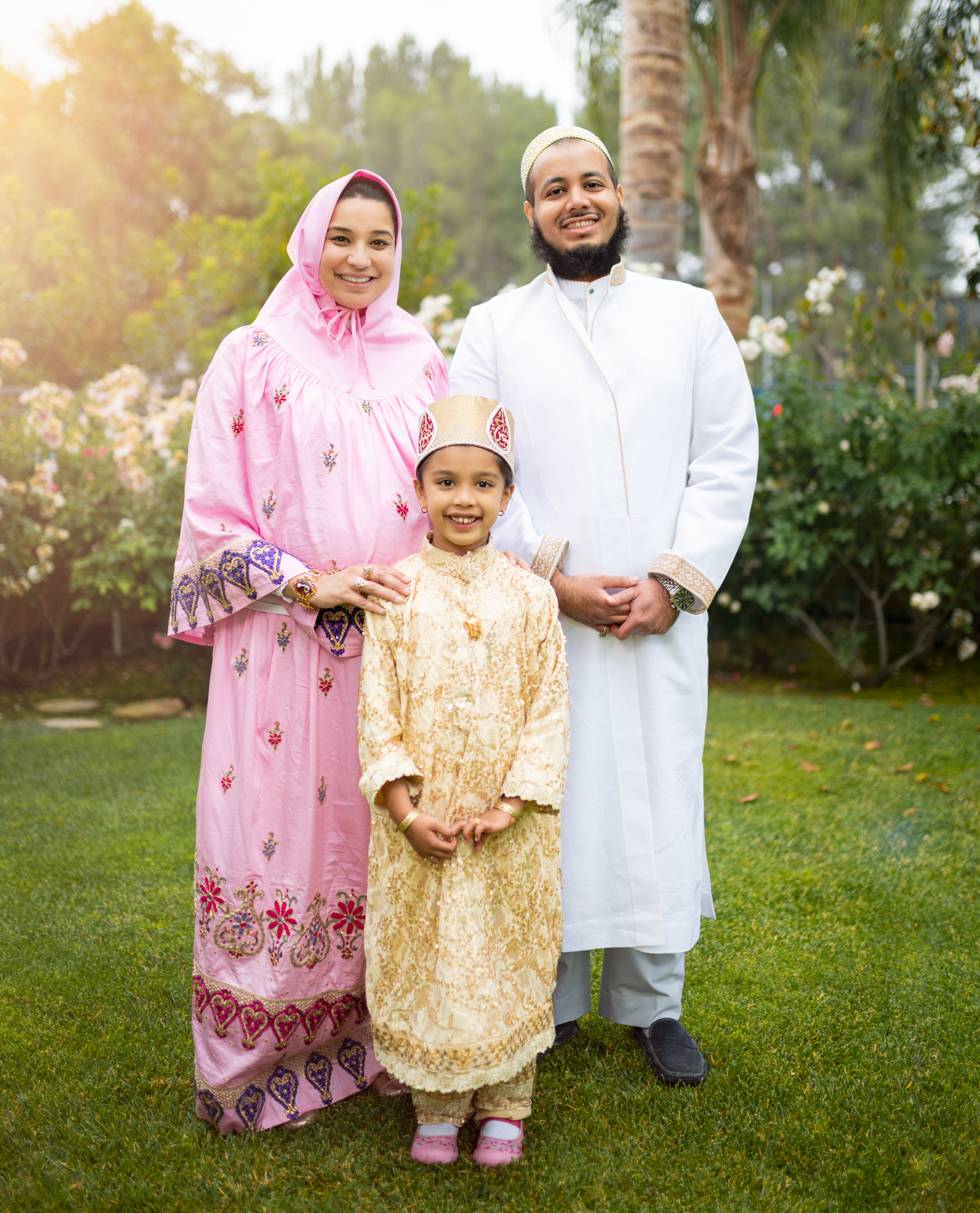
- Dawoodi Bohra family in their religious attire.

Total population
- 1,000,000–2,000,000; 2021

Regions with significant populations
- India
- 500,000–1,000,000

Religions
- Shi'a Islam

Scriptures
- Quran

Languages
- Predominantly spoken: Lisan al-Dawat; English; Gujarati; Hindi; Urdu; Historical: Arabic; Sacred: Classical Arabic

Related ethnic groups
- Shi'a: Fivers; Twelvers; Ismailis: Druze; Nizari; Qarmati; Mustaalis: Hafizi; Hebtiahs; Qutbi; Atba-e-Malak; Tayyibis: Alavi; Jafari; Sulaymani

Website
- thedawoodibohras.com

The Dawoodi Bohras are a religious denomination within the Ismā'īlī branch of Shia Islam. They number approximately 1.5 million worldwide and have settled in over 40 countries around the world. The majority of the Dawoodi Bohra community resides in India, with sizable congregations in Pakistan, Yemen, East Africa, and the Middle East. They also have a growing presence in Europe, North America, and Australia.

The Dawoodi Bohra community follows Islam and is specifically identified as Shia Fatimid Ismaili Tayyibi Dawoodi Bohra. Their faith is founded on the conviction that there is only one God, that the Quran is the message of God, that the Islamic prophet Muhammad is the last of the prophets, and that Ali is his legatee and successor. They follow the tenets of Islam, such as reciting the Quran, performing the five daily prayers (Salah), annual tithes of 2.5% (or 1/40) of total income and savings (Zakat), fasting during the month of Ramadan (Sawm), the mandatory Hajj pilgrimage to Makkah and the Prophet's shrine in Madinah and religious struggle (Jihad).

At the core of their faith is the belief that the Ahl al-Bayt, members of the Muhammad's family, are the rightful imams and like all Shia Muslims, they hold that Ali bin Abi Talib, Muhammad's legatee, succeeded him and provided guidance, interpretation and explanation of the Quran. A fundamental tenet of the Dawoodi Bohra faith is that there will always be an imam present on earth, who is descended from Muhammad's grandson Imam Husain, to carry on the task of leading the faithful.

When the imam chooses to withdraw from public view (as is the case today), he is represented by the Da'i al-Mutlaq (an unrestricted missionary) who, like the imam, preserves and protects the faith until the imam's return. After the 21st imam chose seclusion in 1132AH, the Dais operated from Yemen and subsequently from India, for the last 300 years. The present leader, Mufaddal Saifuddin, is the 53rd Da'i al-Mutlaq; he assumed office in January 2014.

The Bohras are generally well-educated and wealthy, typically affluent traders, businesspersons, entrepreneurs, and professionals (doctors, lawyers or accountants).

The word "Bohra" comes from the Gujarati word vohrvu or vyavahar, meaning "to trade". Their heritage derives from the traditions of the Fatimid imams, the direct descendants of the Islamic Prophet Muhammad through his daughter Fatima, who ruled over North Africa between the 10th and 11th centuries CE. Adherence to traditional values is important for the community, who are known for their business-oriented and forward outlook. Nonetheless, they are the only Muslim community of India to practice Female Genital Mutilation. Although the practice is widely criticised, the government is reluctant to acknowledge it, but one group has stepped up to defend it. In 2016, over 80% of surveyed women wanted the practice to end.

Lisan al-Da'wat is the language of the Bohras. The language is based on a Neo-Indo-Aryan language, Gujarati, but incorporates a heavy amount of Arabic, Urdu, and Persian vocabulary and is written in the Arabic script naskh style. The Bohras' cultural attire is known as Libas al-Anwar. Prominent religious festivals include Eid-e-Milad an-Nabi, Eid al-Fitr, Eid al-Adha and Muharram. The majlis, or sitting room, is part of the community's traditional practice of congregating on major dates in the Islamic calendar. During their gatherings the Bohra community eat in groups of eight, seated around a large steel platter called a thaal.

== History ==
Dawoodi Bohras are a subset of the Taiyebi sect of the Musta'li branch of Isma'ilism, a part of Shia Islam. Central to their beliefs is reverence for the Fatimid imams, who trace their lineage to Muhammad's daughter, Fatima.

=== Fatimid imams ===
The Fatimids, descendants of Muhammad, ruled over North Africa and Egypt, Hejaz, and the Levant between the 10th and 11th centuries. They flourished during what Maurice Lombard called the Golden Age of Islam, and were patrons of arts, learning, and scientific discovery. The 14th Imam, al-Mui’zz, founded the city of Cairo and established Al-Azhar University, one of the oldest universities in the world.

Before the empire's decline, Al-Amir bi-Ahkam Allah, the 20th Fatimid imam, directed his grand emissary, Arwa bint Ahmad, the Sulayhid queen of Yemen, to establish the office of the Da'i al-Mutlaq (lit. 'unrestricted missionary') to act as vicegerent for his son, the 21st Imam Al-Tayyib Abu'l-Qasim and to lead the faithful. Arwa bint Ahmad appointed Zoeb bin Musa as the first Da'i al-Mutlaq.

Succession to the office of al-Da'i al-Mutlaq happens through nass, whereby each Da'i appoints a successor in his own lifetime.

=== Origins in India ===
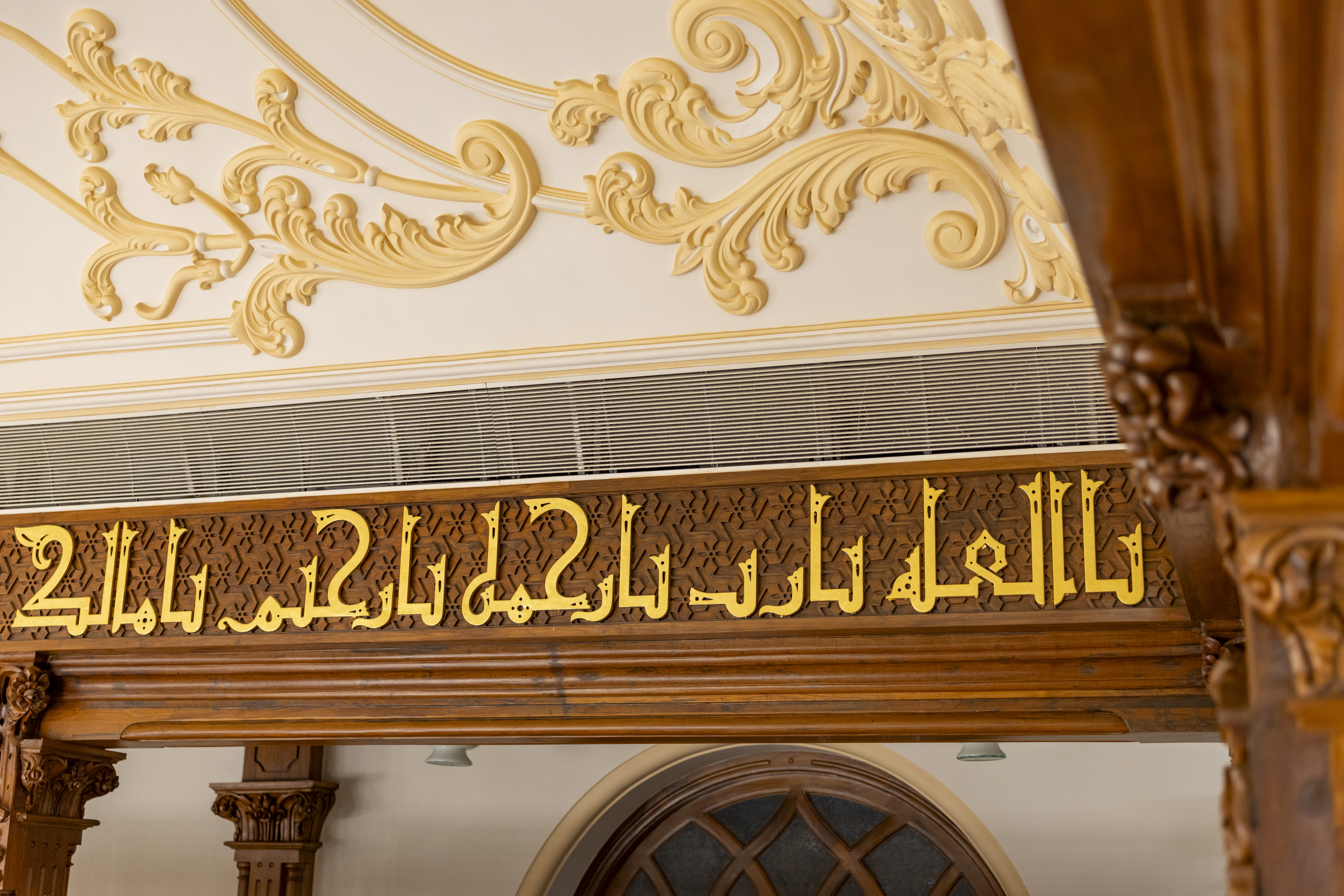
The names of Allah in traditional Arabic calligraphy, as mentioned in the Quran.

The roots of the community's establishment in India go back to the Fatimid era, when Al Mustansir Billah, the 18th Imam, sent a Dai named Abdullah from Yemen to initiate the Da’wah on his behalf. Abdullah arrived in Cambay (modern day Khambhat, Gujarat) in AD 1067/H 460 and soon won many converts, including local rulers. Abdullah was the first Wali (representative) in India.

The seclusion of al-Tayyib led to the establishment of the office of al-Dai al-Mutlaq in Yemen. The Indian community which had pledged allegiance to the Fatimids continued to remain loyal to the Dais in Yemen. This resulted in a secession with the Hafizis, led by Al-Tayyib's uncle, Abd al-Majid. Twenty-three Dais operated from their mountain bases in Yemen for nearly four centuries, preserving the faith and authoring seminal works. The 19th Dai, Idris Imaduddin, wrote numerous works, including a comprehensive and detailed history of the Fatimid faith.

Meanwhile, the community in Gujarat had maintained ties with their Dais in Yemen, who closely supervised their affairs and regularly welcomed Bohra delegations from Gujarat. During this time, the community grew in size, especially in Cambay, Patan, Sidhpur, and Ahmedabad.

Yusuf bin Sulayman Najmuddin, originally from Sidhpur, a town in Gujarat, was one of the Bohras who travelled to Yemen to seek knowledge from the Dai. Najmuddin arrived in Yemen while still in his youth and first studied under Hasan bin Nuh al-Bharuchi. He was eventually appointed the 23rd Dai as his successor and became the first from the Indian community to lead the Tayyibi Da’wa as the 24th al-Mutlaq. When Najmuddin died in CE 1567/H 974, the central headquarters of the Da’wah were transferred from Yemen to Gujarat by his Indian successor, Jalal bin Hasan.

When the 26th al-Dai al-Mutlaq died in CE 1589/H 997, he was succeeded by Dawood Bin Qutubshah. However, three years later, Sulayman bin Hasan, a high-ranking dignitary in Yemen, claimed the succession to the leadership of the community for himself. This succession dispute was brought before the Mughal emperor Akbar in 1597. A special tribunal decided in favour of Dawood Bin Qutubshah. However, this did not dissolve tensions, leading to a schism in the community. A majority of Bohras acknowledged Dawood Bin Qutubshah as the rightful successor and henceforth came to be known as Dawoodis (or Da’udis.)

=== Major centres ===
Over the next few centuries, the Bohra headquarters moved within India with the changing location of the Dai. The centre of the Da’wah has been in six places: Ahmedabad (eight Dais, from 1567/974 to 1655/1065); Jamnagar in the Kathiawar region of Gujarat (five Dais, from 1655/1065 to 1737/1150); Ujjan in the present-day state of Madhya Pradesh (two Dais, from 1737/1150 to 1779/1193); Burhanpur, Madhya Pradesh (one Dai, from 1779/1193 to 1785/1200); Surat in the present-day state of Gujarat (eight Dais, from 1785/1200 to 1933/1351) and Mumbai in the state of Maharashtra, where the current Dai resides.

Starting in the early 19th century, some community members emigrated in search of better livelihoods. The first wave of Bohra traders to migrate to East Africa did so in the aftermath of a severe drought in Kathiawar. The 43rd Dai, Abdeali Saifuddin, invited 12,000 of his followers to Surat, and provided food, work and lodgings for all of them. His only conditions were that they learn and practice vocational skills, and he gave them their earnings when it was time for them to leave Surat. Many from this group decided to use this capital to venture forth to trade in East Africa.

A century on from Abdeali Saifuddin, Taher Saifuddin acceded to the office of al-Dai al-Mutlaq as the 51st Dai, He is credited with revitalising the community by restructuring its organisation on modern lines.

He shifted the community headquarters from Surat to Mumbai, which had become a major centre of trade and commerce in India. Over time, Dawoodi Bohra communities have expanded globally through migration, contributing to the establishment of thriving communities in various regions.

== Faith and beliefs ==
=== Monotheism ===
As Muslims, the Dawoodi Bohras believe in Tawhid, Islam's central monotheistic concept of a single, indivisible God (Allah).

=== Seven pillars ===
Walayah – devotion to God, Muhammad, his family, and his descendants – is the most important of the seven pillars of Islam according to the Dawoodi Bohra faith.

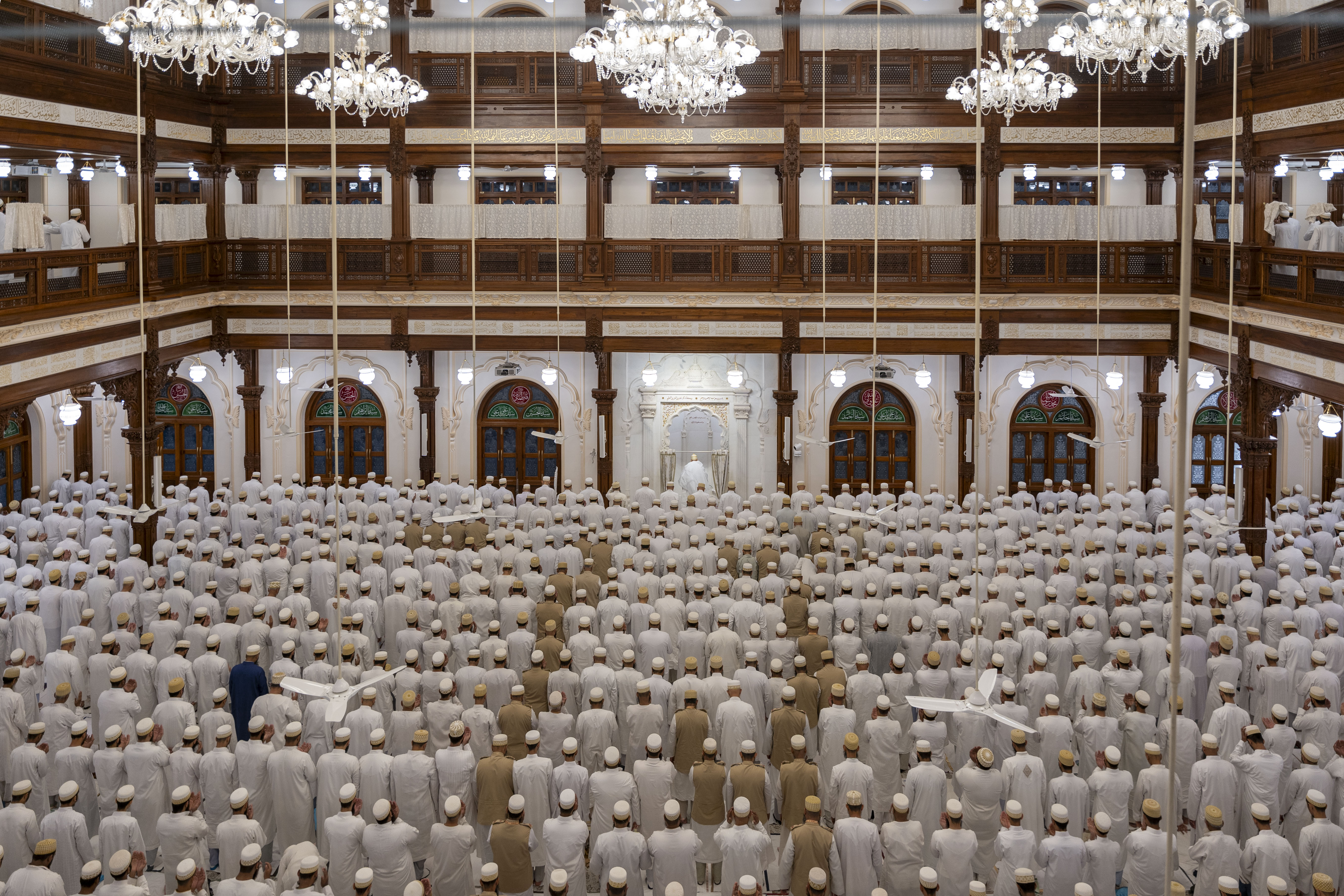
Dawoodi Bohra community members gather for evening prayers at the community's 100 year-old Saifee Masjid in Mumbai

The other six pillars are tahaarat (purity in body and thought), salah (daily ritual prayers), zakaat (offering a portion of one's income in the cause of God), sawm (fasting in the month of Ramadan), hajj (a ritual pilgrimage to Mecca), and jihad (striving in the way of God). The Bohras build mosques wherever they live to congregate for prayers and majalis (religious congregation) for the zikr of God and his prophets, imams, and da'is.

=== Leadership ===
During the seclusion of the Imam, his vicegerent, al-Dai al-Mutlaq was appointed to lead the community and administer, with complete authority, its secular and religious affairs.

The Dai teaches Quranic precepts, which form the foundation of the faith, and guides the community. Over the nine centuries that this office has existed, each Dai is considered to have played an important role in shaping the community's social and economic progress. Community members seek and abide by his counsel in different aspects of life.

The 1st Dai, Dhu'ayb bin Musa, was appointed in 1138 (532H) in Yemen by Queen Arwa bint Ahmed when the 21st Imam went into seclusion. Over the next 400 years, 23 Dais established the Dawat in Yemen. The seat of the Dawat then transferred from Yemen to India, where the 24th Dai, Yusuf bin Sulayman Najmuddin, became the first Dai to assume office from this region. Despite territorial and political upheavals through different periods, the Dais persevered and continued to lead the faithful and preserve the faith.

The current leader of the Dawoodi Bohra community is the 53rd Dai al-Mutlaq, Aali Qadr Mufaddal Saifuddin, who lives in India. Syedna Saifuddin is a descendant of Muhammad, who was himself a descendant of Abraham, through an unbroken chain of noble and august ancestry. His heritage to Muhammad traces back through Muhammad's daughter, Fatima al-Zahra, and her husband Ali ibn Abi Talib. From Fatima and Ali, the line continues through their son, Hussein, and the subsequent imams in the Ismaili tradition up to the fifth imam, Ja'far al-Sadiq.

== Demographics and culture ==
As of 2021, there are an estimated 1 million Dawoodi Bohras around the world. The majority reside in India and Pakistan. A sizeable diaspora is spread across Europe, North America, the Middle East, Asia and East Africa.

The Bohras are prosperous traders, industrialists, businesspersons or skilled professionals.

=== Name and etymology ===
The word Bohra takes root in the Gujarati word vohrvu, in reference to their traditional occupation as traders. The name 'Dawoodi' is an eponym derived from Dawood Bin Qutubshah, the 27th Da'i al-Mutlaq, who emerged as the leader of the majority following a schism in 1588.

=== Language ===
Dawoodi Bohra culture is a blend of Yemeni, Egyptian and Indian cultures. Their language Lisan al-Dawat, written in Perso-Arabic script, derives from Arabic, Urdu, Persian, Sanskrit, and Gujarati.

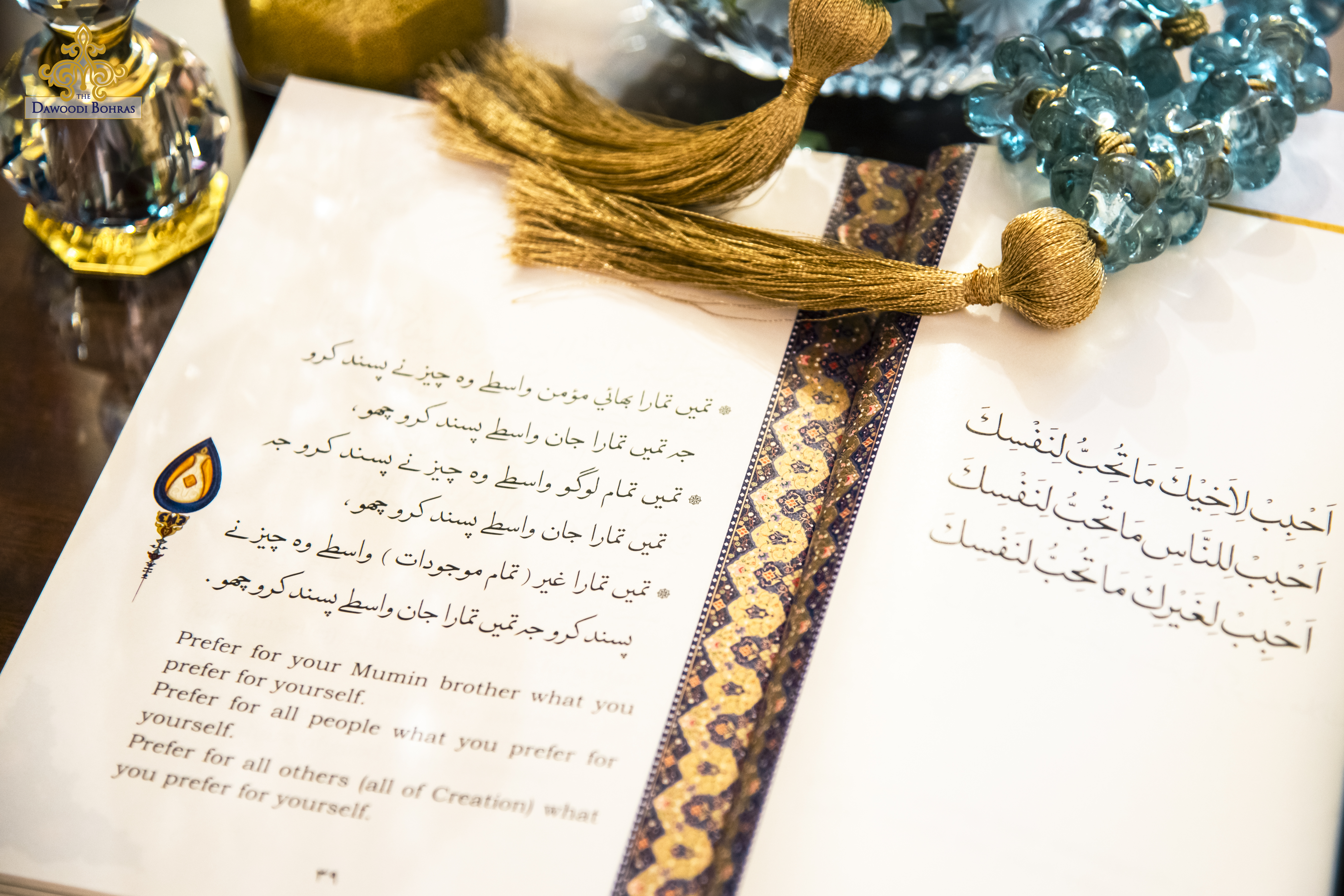
A manuscript emphasizing the principle of selflessness in Islamic teachings

Lisan al-Dawat, which takes its basic structure from Gujarati developed as a medium to articulate Islamic values and heritage. Though Arabic remains community's dominant liturgical language, Lisan al-Dawat is its language of sermons and its medium of official and day-to-day communication.

=== Dress ===
The Dawoodi Bohras wear distinct attire. The men traditionally dress in a predominantly white, three-piece outfit: kurta, a form of tunic; saaya, an overcoat of equal length; and izaar, loose-fit trousers; with topi, a crocheted white cap with a gold design. Men, adhering to the customs of Muhammad, are expected to grow a full beard.

The women wear a two-piece dress called rida, distinct from hijab, purdah, and chador. Its distinguishing features are bright colors, decorative patterns and lace.

=== Cuisine ===
Joining each other for meals is a well-known Dawoodi Bohra custom. Families and friends gather around sharing the meal from a large circular platter called a thaal. The thaal is raised upon a kundali or tarakti made of wood or metal, on top of a safra, a large cloth that covers the floor.

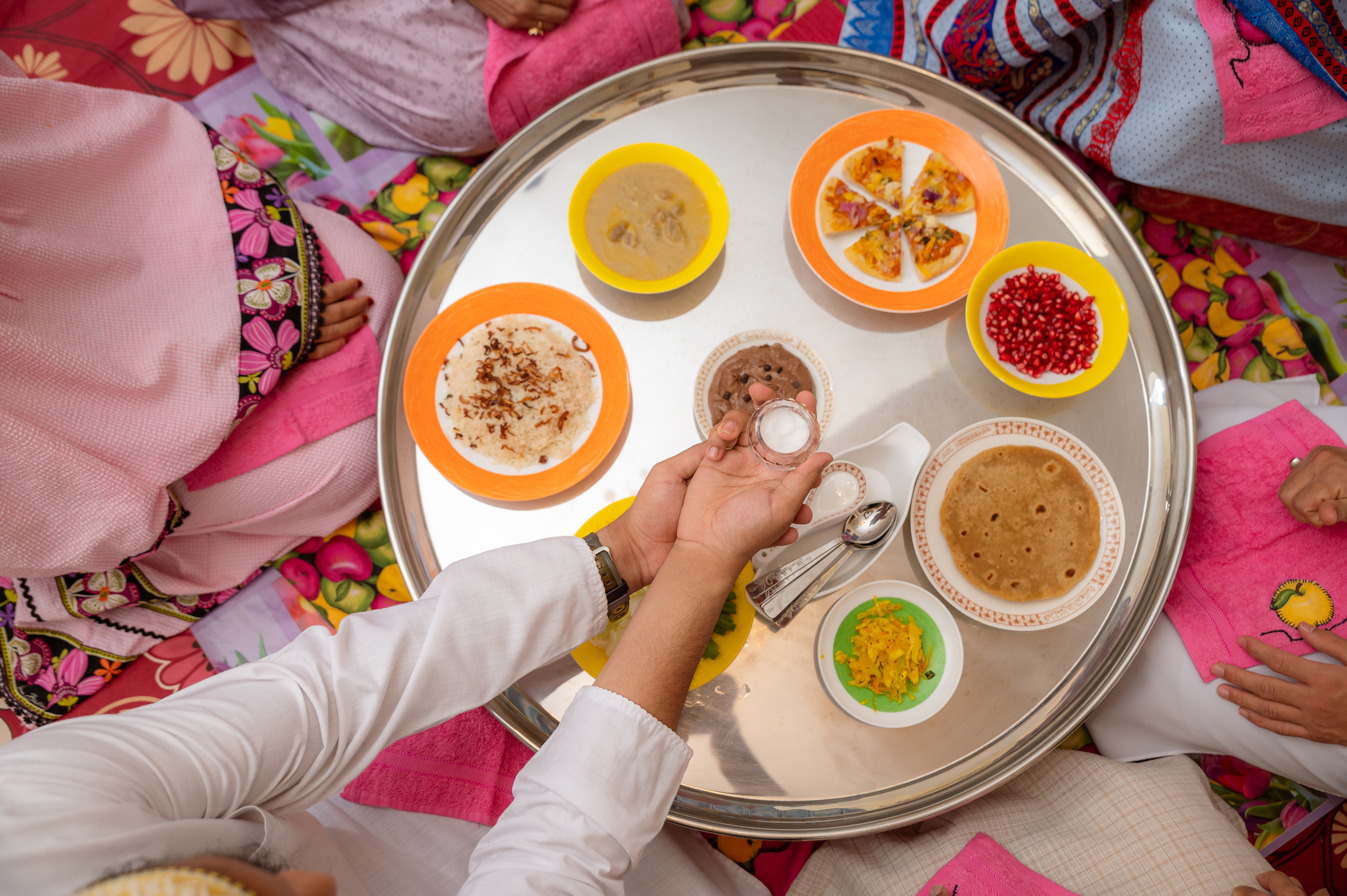
Dawoodi Bohra traditional thaal

The meal begins and ends with a taste of salt, traditionally said to cleanse the palate and prevent diseases. A common etiquette is to wash both hands using a chilamchi lota (basin and jug). At community feasts, the Bohras first eat mithaas (sweet dish), followed by kharaas (savoury dish), and then the main course. Food wastage is frowned upon. Those seated at the thaal are encouraged to take smaller portions and expected to finish whatever is taken.

The Bohra cuisine, influenced by Gujarati, Persian, Yemeni, Arabic and Egyptian cuisines, is known for its unique taste and dishes such as bohra-style biryani, dal chaawal palidu (rice, lentils, and curry), kheema samosa (minced mutton samosa), dabba gosht, and masala bateta (spicy potatoes).

== Traditions and practices ==
=== Qardan Hasana ===
Islam prohibits riba (lit. 'usury') and interest; the Dawoodi Bohras follow the practice of Qardan Hasana (Note: The term Qardan Hasana, in the Islamic context, has been mentioned six times in the Quran.) (lit. 'good loan'), which means interest-free loans. Based on the ideal of benefitting the borrower (as opposed to the lender), this model has played an important role in the economic growth of the community.

Community members are discouraged from bank saving, time deposits or borrowing, EMI finance schemes, overdrafts, contributing to or accepting money from insurance schemes, investments in commodities and stock markets, cryptocurrency, pension, mutual or retirement fund investments deeming them haram (forbidden) in Islam. Instead, he encourages strict adherence to traditional Islamic financial principles, urging followers to rely on community-based support systems rather than conventional financial instruments which are speculative in nature (gharar, maisir) or interest-based (riba). This approach has led to the development of numerous financial structures within the community, giving community members financial flexibility and integration with modern economic systems.

=== Mithaq ===
The rite of initiation for the Bohras is the mithaq. This ceremony is a covenant between the believer and God, effected through God's representative on earth. The mithaq binds a believer to the duties owed to God, including an oath of allegiance: a vow to accept the spiritual guidance of the Da'i al-Mutlaq wholeheartedly and without reservation. This ceremony, akin to baptism in Christianity, is mandatory to enter the fold of the faith.

The mithaq is first taken at whatever age a child is deemed to have reached maturity: most commonly, thirteen years for girls, fourteen or fifteen for boys. These vows are renewed throughout a Bohra's adult life.

=== Calendar ===
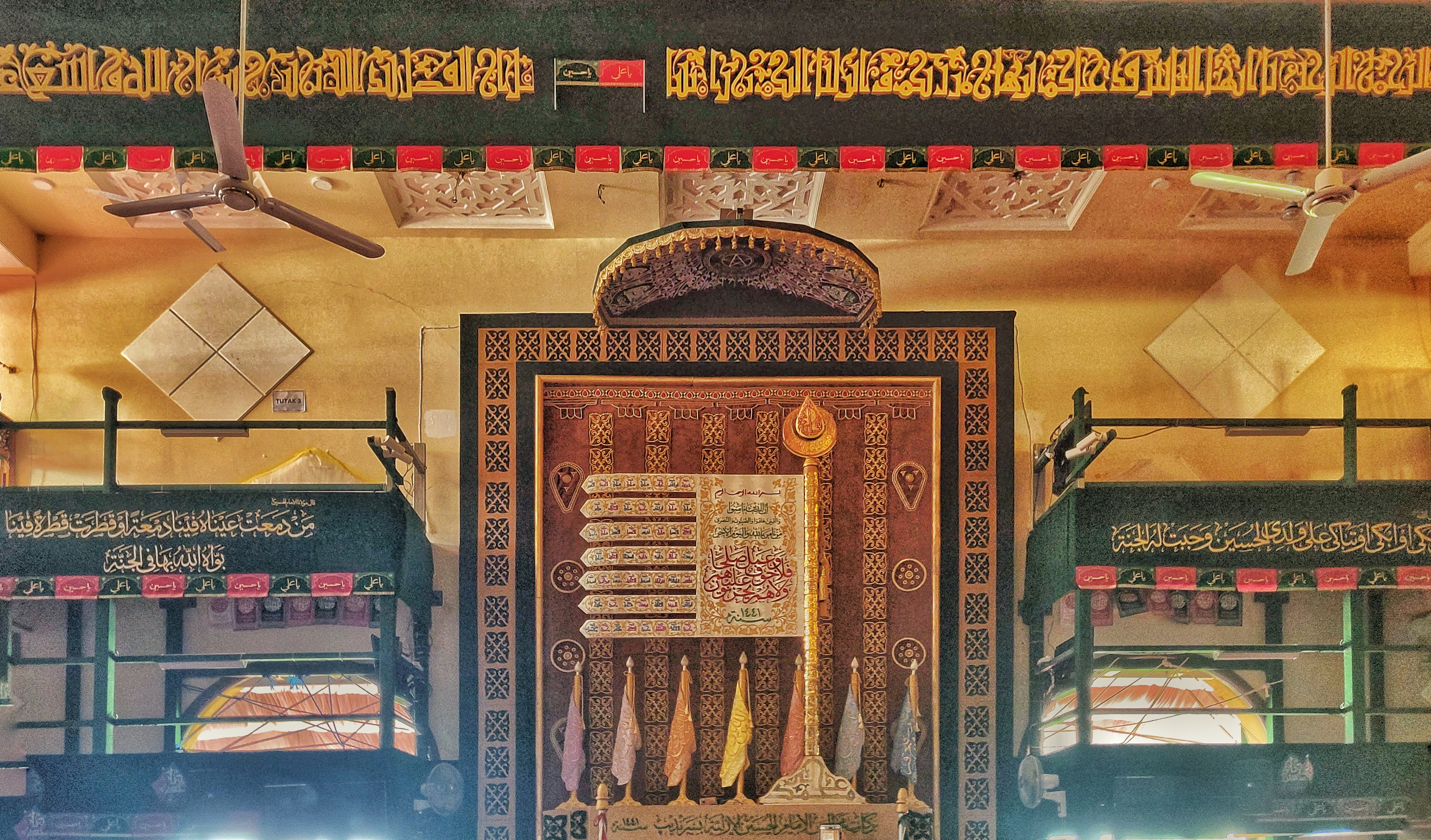
Tazyeen (decoration) of Masjid al-Husaini in Colombo, the host venue of Ashara Mubaraka (2019).

The Dawoodi Bohra follow a Fatimid-era tabular calendar which matches the lunar cycle of 354 days (and hence requires no adjustments). The odd-numbered months have 30 days and the even-numbered months have 29 days—except in a leap year when the 12th and final month, Zil Hajj, has 30 days. This contrasts with other Muslim communities, which base the beginnings of specific Islamic months on sightings of the moon crescent.

==== Occasions ====
Dawoodi Bohras observe all significant occasions on the Muslim calendar, such as Muharram, Ramadan, Eid al Fitr and Eid al Adha and Mawlid al Nabi. They also observe some occasions particular to their sect, such as the death anniversaries of previous dais and the birthday of the current dai. These occasions typically bring together members of the community for educational sermons and communal meals.

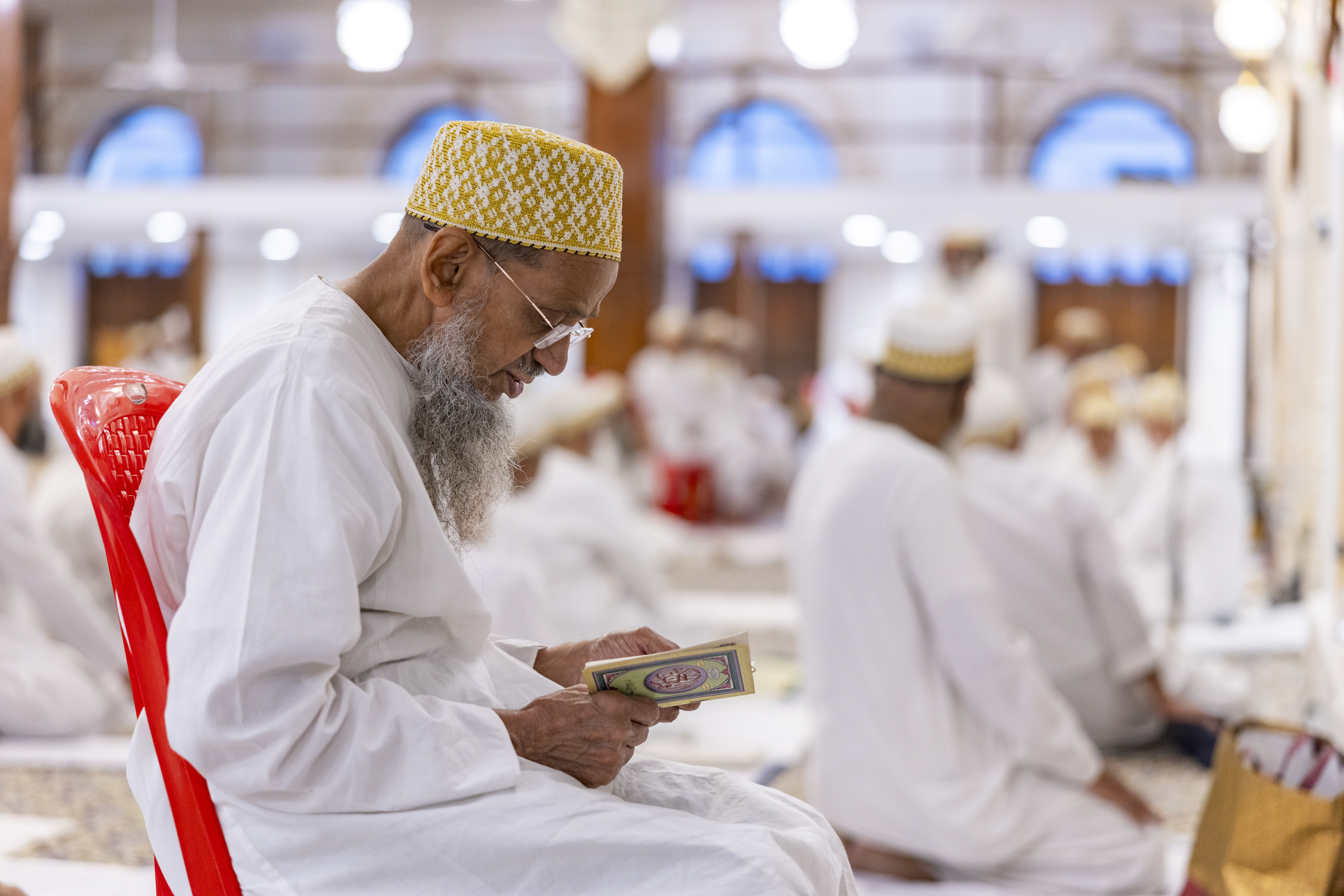
Dawoodi Bohra man recites the Quran during the holy month of Ramadan

During Ramadan, the 9th month of the Islamic calendar, the Dawoodi Bohras like rest of Islamic world, observe a mandatory fast from dawn to dusk. The Bohras congregate in their local mosques for daily prayers (particularly for the evening prayers), and break the day-long fast with the iftaar (lit. 'fast breaking') meal together. Ramadan is a month of heightened spiritual activity for the Bohras that ends with Eid al-Fitr.

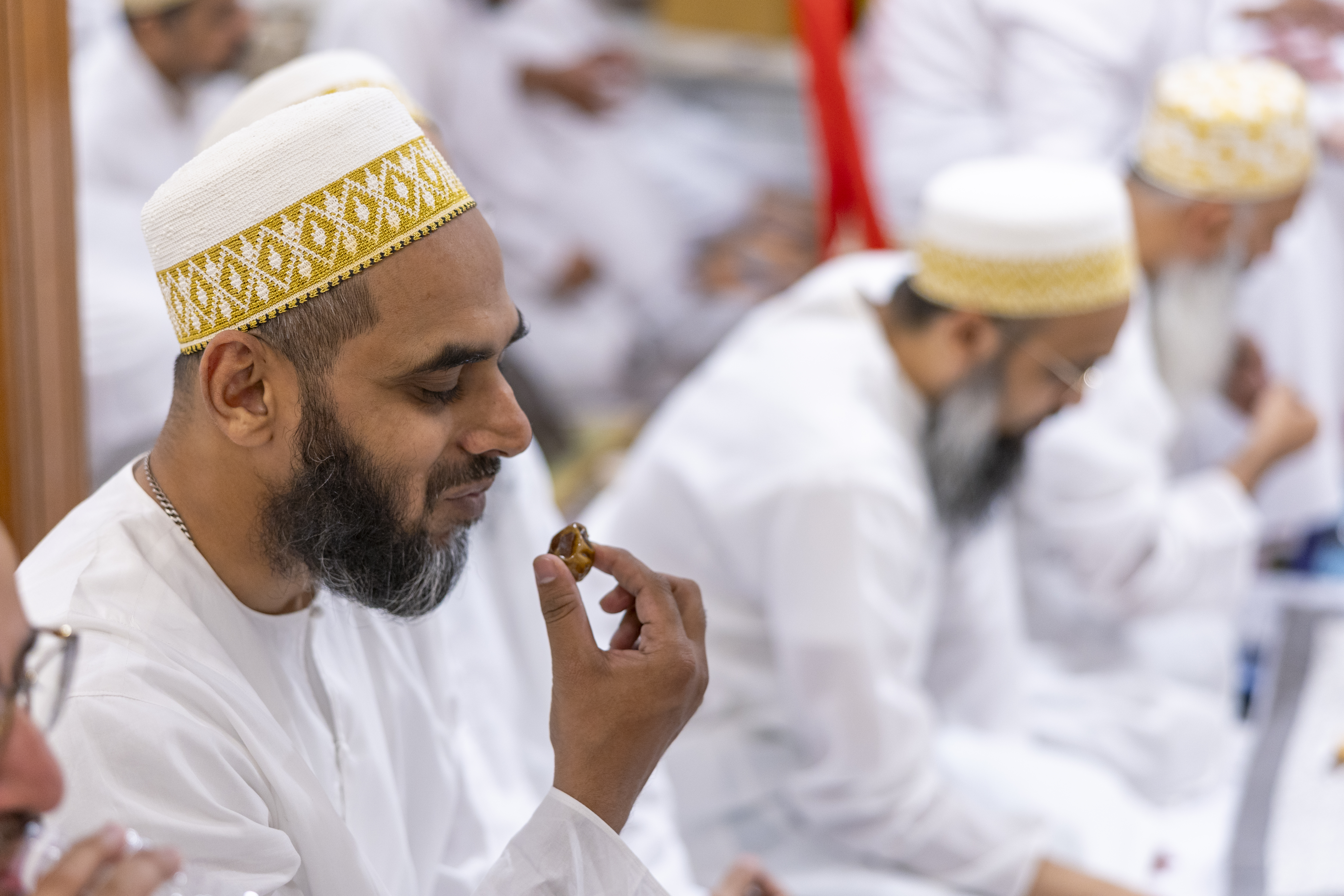
A Dawoodi Bohra breaking fast with a date at iftar during Ramadan.

In the month of Zil Hajj the Bohras undertake hajj and all celebrate Eid al-Adha at its conclusion. In line with Shia traditions, on the 18th of Zil Hajj, the day Muhammad publicly anointed Ali ibn Abi Talib his successor, the Bohras mark celebrate Eid i-Ghadir, by observing, fasting, and offering special prayers. Special prayers and congregations are also held during other major events such as the day Muhammad first began his Da'wah (lit. 'mission'), the night of Isra and Mi'raj, the birthday of Muhammad, the urs mubarak (lit. 'remembrance day') of prominent community leaders, and the birthday of the current Da'i al-Mutlaq.

==== Muharram ====
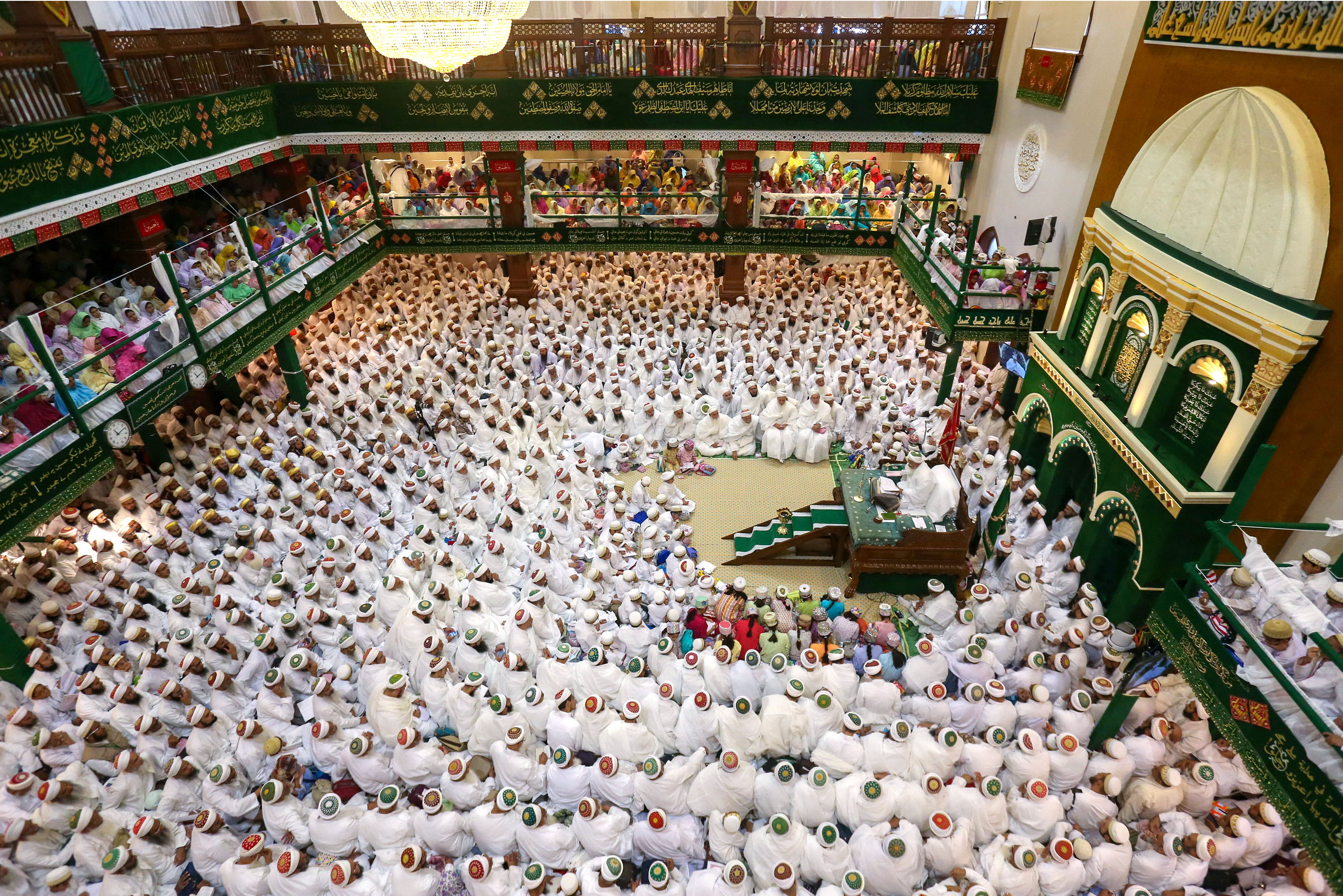
Syedna Mufaddal Saifuddin addresses the community during the ʿAshara Mubāraka sermons in Houston, USA in 2015

The grandson of Prophet Muhammad, Husayn ibn Ali, was martyred along with his family and companions on the plains of Karbala while on a journey from Mecca, through the deserts of modern-day Iraq, to Kufa. The Bohras believe that Husayn's sacrifice was foretold by Muhammad, and that he was destined to change the course of Islam as a result of his martyrdom. Remembrance of the martyrdom of Husayn ibn Ali, often linked to the hagiography of John the Baptist and Jesus Christ, is among the most important events of the year for the Bohras.

Known as ʿAshara Mubāraka (lit. 'the Blessed Ten'), the Dawoodi Bohras congregate for a series of ten majālis (lit. 'congregations') in the beginning of the month of Muharram For them, Husayn ibn Ali's martyrdom epitomizes the values of humanity, justice, and truth. They consider his sacrifice and stand against tyranny, to offer lessons in bravery, loyalty, and compassion. These values, they believe, inculcate in them a spirit of self-sacrifice, forbearance, and adherence to their faith.

During the ʿAshara Mubāraka, the Bohra communities all over the world host a series of majālis twice a day, one each in the morning and in the evening, recounting Husayn ibn Ali's sacrifice, which forms the central theme of the discourse. The majālis led by the Da'i al-Mutlaq on occasion attract hundreds of thousands of followers.

=== Traditions ===
==== Rasm-e Saifee ====
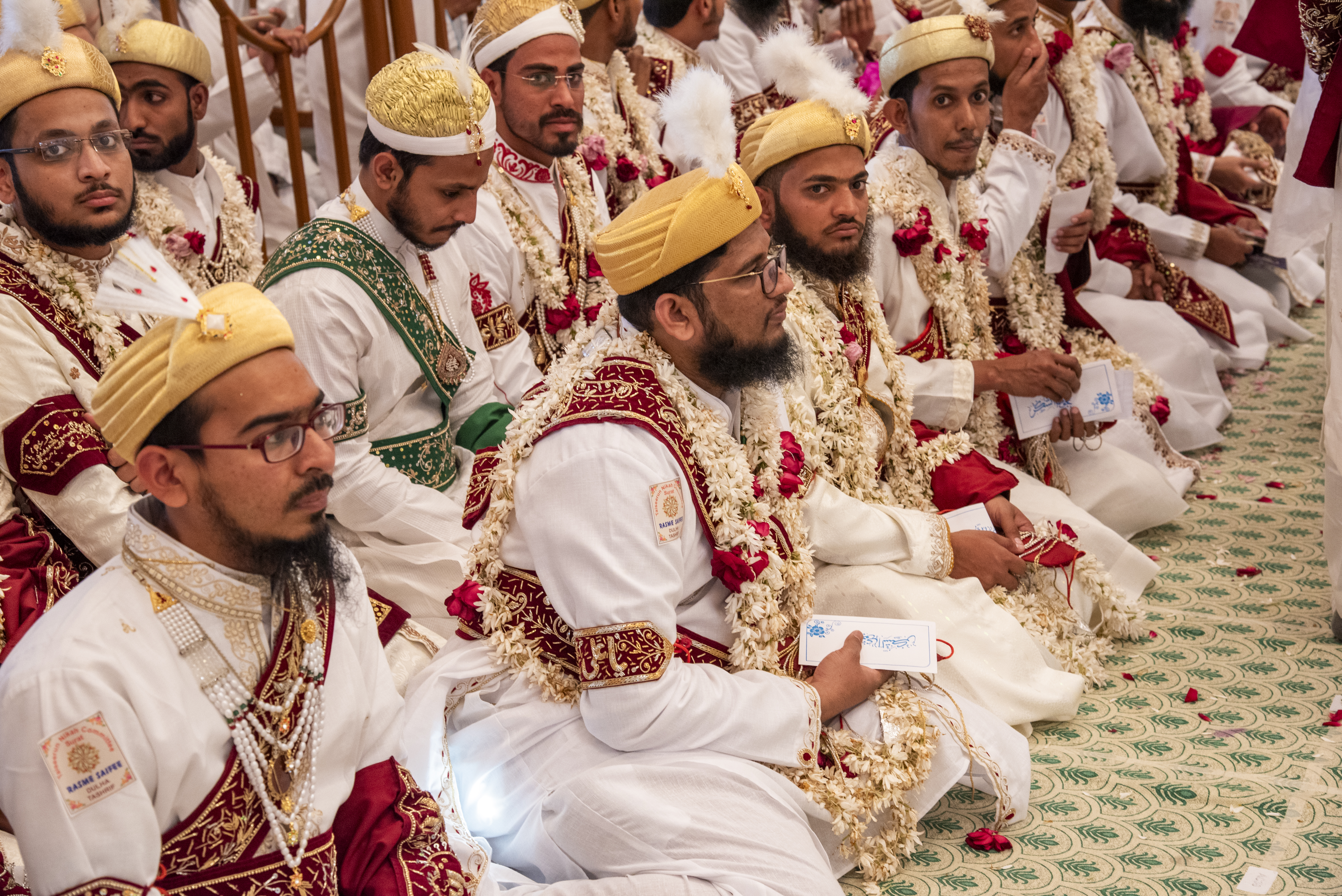
Bridegrooms pose for a photo with Syedna Mufaddal Saifuddin in a Rasm-e Saifee

To facilitate marriages among the Dawoodi Bohra, Taher Saifuddin, the 51st Da'i al-Mutlaq, started Rasm-e Saifee in Jamnagar c. 1952 and later institutionalised it c. 1963. During Rasm-e Saifee multiple nikah are solemnized at the hands of the Da'i al-Mutlaq and his representatives.

Saifuddin's son and successor, Mohammed Burhanuddin, founded the International Taiseer al-Nikah Committee (ITNC), which now organizes Rasm-e Saifee throughout the year at various religious events. Burhanuddin's successor, Mufaddal Saifuddin, continues to uphold the tradition.

==== Pilgrimages ====
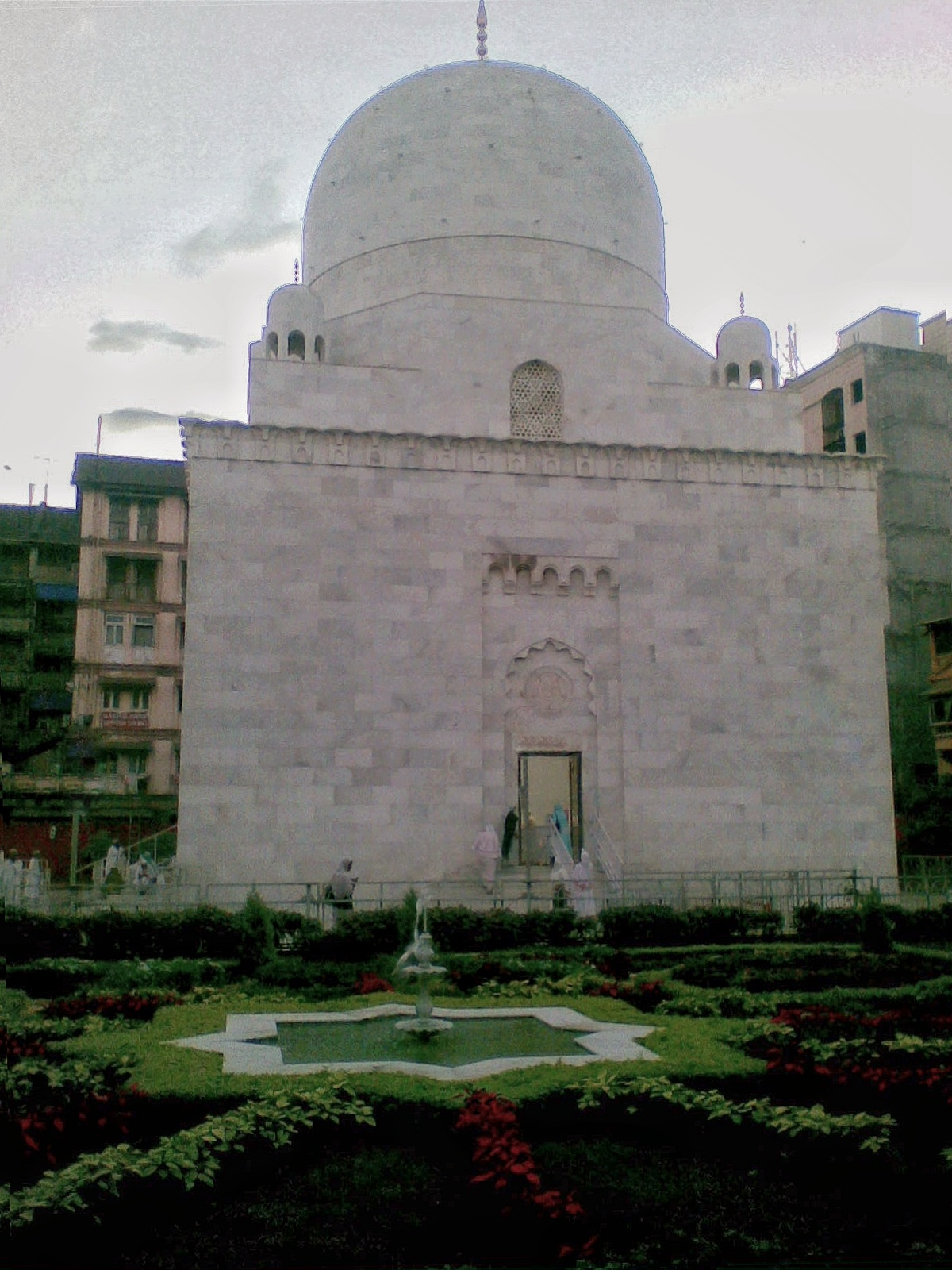
Raudat Tahera, mausoleum of Taher Saifuddin and Mohammed Burhanuddin II.

It is customary among the Bohras to visit mausoleums, mosques, and other places of religious importance in Palestine, Jordan, Syria, Egypt, Saudi Arabia, Yemen, Iraq, and India. In most places, a community-administered complex (mazaar) provides accommodation, business centers, dining, and various recreational activities to the traveling Bohras.

A Bohra mausoleum typically has white exteriors with a golden finial at the apex of the dome. The interior is usually lit up in incandescent light and Quranic verses are inscribed on its walls. These mausoleums embody several meanings in the form of their structure and build. As an example, Raudat Tahera, an austere structure in Mumbai, has a range of intricacies in its design. The inner height of Raudat Tahera is 80 feet above the plinth: the number signifies the age of Taher Saifuddin, who is buried there. The sanctum of the mausoleum is 51 × 51 feet, which symbolises Saifuddin's position as the 51st Dai al-Mutlaq. The entire Quran is inscribed in gold on its walls, whilst Bismillah is engraved 113 times in precious stones, and four doors, one on each side of the wall, are clad with silver. The inner side of the dome proclaims, "Allah holds the sky and earth together which none else can."

== Society ==
=== Community centers ===
The office of the Da'i al-Mutlaq, known as Dawat-e-Hadiyah, manages the affairs of the close-knit Dawoodi Bohra community through a distributed network of Jamaat committees. The Dawat-e-Hadiyah head office is at Badri Mahal in Fort, Mumbai.

Several sub-committees and trusts administer different aspects of a local Bohra community under the purview of the respective Jamat. Set up anywhere Bohras live and work, a jamat may number from a hundred to tens of thousands of Bohras. A resident Amil, appointed by the dai is the president of a given jamat. and administers and manages its socio-religious affairs. At the local mosque or markaz under his jurisdiction, the Amil leads daily prayers, and presides over sermons and discourses.

==== Mosques ====
Mosques are the centres of Dawoodi Bohra communities around the world. It was often the practice of Bohras who migrated to a new city or country to build a mosque (or a markaz — community center — if it was not possible to build a mosque). While a Dawoodi Bohra mosque is primarily a place of worship and congregation, it also forms an important socio-cultural center for the community. They are also a center for education, in line with Fatimid traditions. A mosque usually houses a dining hall for communal meals, called a mawaid or jamaat khana, as well as classrooms and administrative offices. Mosques are predominantly constructed in the Neo-Fatimid style, with the names of God and verses from the Quran engraved on its walls. Some Dawoodi Bohra mosques in India, such as the Saifee Masjid in Bhendi Bazaar, Mumbai, feature a fusion of Fatimid, Indian, and classical architecture. Dawoodi Bohra mosques are usually multi-storied structures; the main prayer hall on the ground floor is used by men while women participate in prayers and sermons from large galleries on the higher floors. Building new and restoring old mosques is an important part of Dawoodi Bohra culture. The last half-century has seen a surge in the building of Bohra mosques across the world, especially after the landmark restoration of al-Jami al-Anwar (the mosque of al-Hakim) in Cairo in 1980.

==== Markaz ====
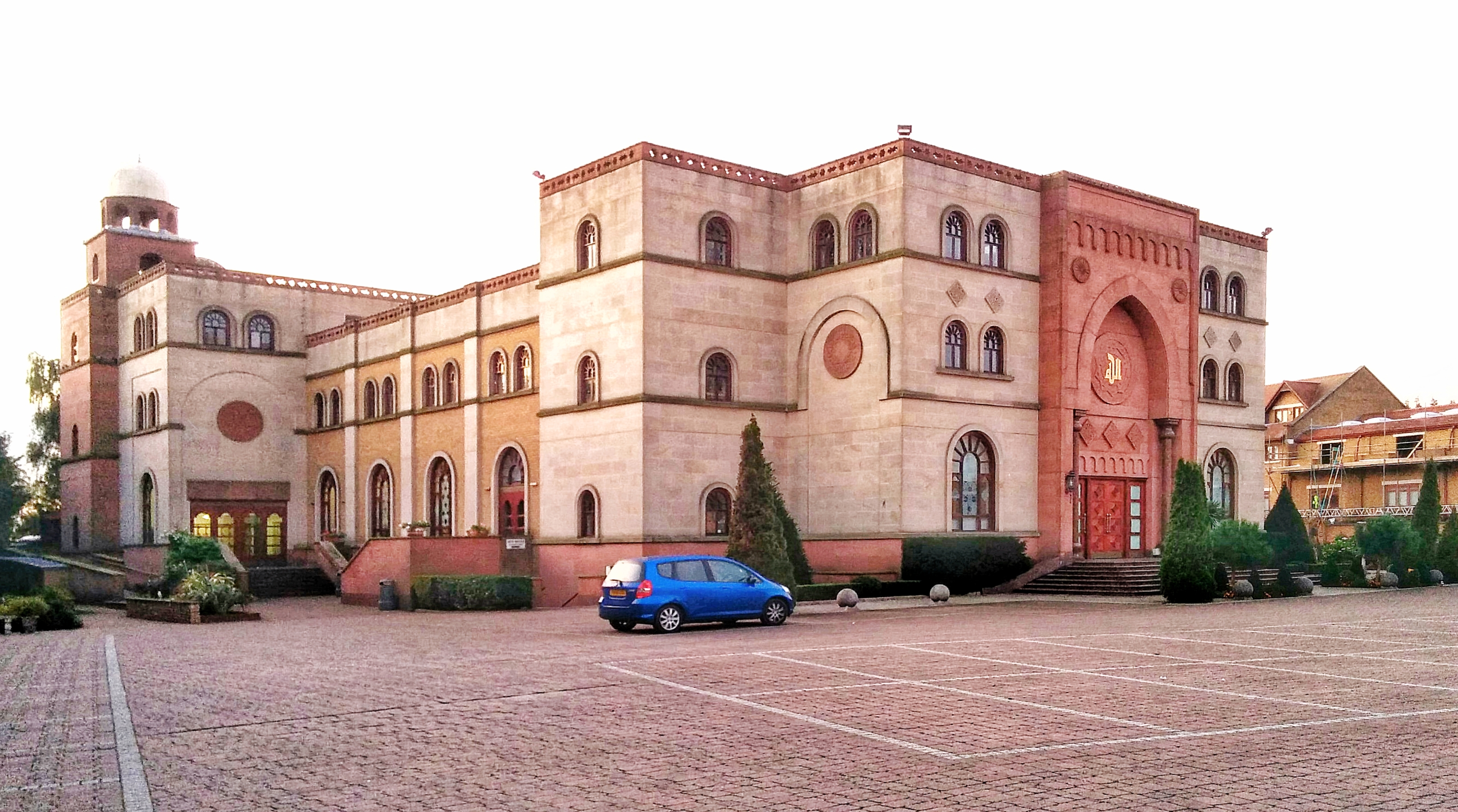
Mohammedi Park Complex (Northolt, London), the largest Bohra community center in Europe.

A Bohra community (or jamaat) is centered around a markaz when there is no existing mosque nearby.

Communal meals are served in dining halls called the jamaat khaana, which are generally part of the mosque complex.

=== FMB community kitchen ===
In 2012, the 53rd Da'i al-Mutlaq established Faiz al-Mawaid al-Burhaniyah (FMB) community kitchens to deliver at least one meal per day to all Bohra families and to ensure no one in the community goes to bed hungry. FMB proved beneficial to women in particular as household cooking is reduced, freeing up time to pursue other activities. Meals are delivered in tiffin containers daily, and have a rotating menu. As of 2021, FMB community kitchens, usually built near mosques, are operational in each and every Bohra community throughout the world.

Whilst FMB has substantially increased food security within the Bohra community, in times of crisis (such as natural disaster or the COVID-19 pandemic), it has also supplied meals and provisions to the wider society.

=== Education ===
In line with Islamic traditions, the Bohras seek both religious and secular education. Men are encouraged to pursue careers in fields such as business, medicine, law and accounting. Guided by Syedna's vision for women's education, Home Science is recognized as a valuable field of study, empowering women with essential life skills and diverse career paths.

Higher education is common in the community.

The community-run Madrasah Saifiyah Burhaniyah (MSB) chain of international co-ed schools teach sciences, humanities, and arts. In 1984, Mohammed Burhanuddin established the first MSB schools in Nairobi and Mumbai. As of 2021, 24 MSB schools operate in Southeast Asia, the Middle East, and Africa, affiliated to IGCSE and ICSE boards.

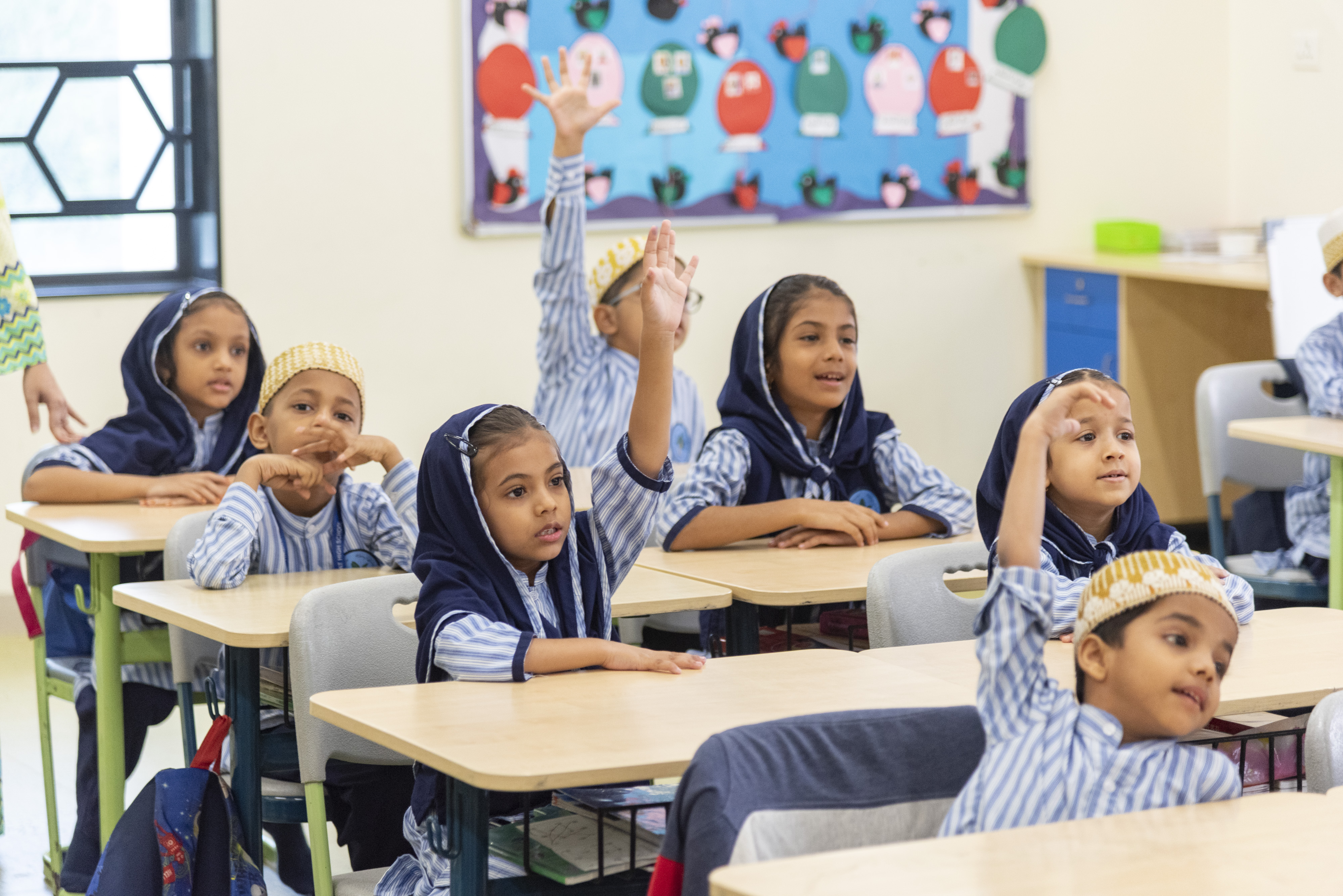
Dawoodi Bohra children in a classroom

Aljamea-tus-Saifiyah (Jamea) is the community's primary educational and cultural institute. Selected students pursue rigorous Islamic and Arabic studies for up to 11 years, and are trained to subsequently lead various institutions Dawat-e-Hadiyah. Aljamea's predecessor is Dars-e-Saifee, an Islamic theology school established by the 43rd Da'i al-Mutlaq Abdeali Saifuddin, in 1814 in Surat, Gujarat. A century later, the 51st Da'i al-Mutlaq Taher Saifuddin renovated and institutionalized it as a university. His son and successor, Mohammed Burhanuddin, further expanded its reach and scope, opening campuses in three more cities and establishing a dedicated center for Quranic sciences, Mahad al-Zahra. The second campus was founded in 1983 in Karachi, Pakistan. A third campus was established in Nairobi, Kenya in 2011, and a fourth in 2013 in Mumbai, India. The libraries of Jamea preserve rare Arabic manuscripts. Other departments of Jamea specialize in the art of Quran recitation, Arabic calligraphy, and Arabesque design.

A significant volume of literature, from Fatimid-era text to treatises, discourses and poetry of the Dua't Mutlaqeen are part of the Jamea curriculum. Per tradition, the current Da'i al-Mutlaq presides over annual examinations (al-Imtihan al-Sanawi) every year. Senior Jamea students additionally undergo a public viva voce examination where they are questioned by rectors of the institute and occasionally by the Da'i al-Mutlaq.

== Status of women ==
=== Overview ===
Women in the Bohra community have long held a respected status, with greater emphasis on education and professional opportunities. According to Jonah Blank, women of the Bohra faith are among the best-educated women in the Indian subcontinent. Inspired by Syedna Saifuddin's progressive vision for women's education, the study of Home Science has equipped women with essential life skills, critical thinking, and problem-solving abilities.

At an interfaith celebration of Eid al-Fitr hosted by the Bohra community of Detroit, Michigan, United States on 7 June 2019, U.S. Congresswoman Brenda Lawrence (Democrat, Michigan's 14th congressional district) praised the Bohras for having "used their voices to make progress on countless issues including gender equality and the environment".

Bohra women integrate business and work with their religious practices and cultural ethos, bolstered by time honoured community principles of women's empowerment through entrepreneurship. Traditionally engaged in home-based businesses, such as knitting and sewing (encouraged in the Bohra community as 'mighzal'), women are now increasingly expanding and transitioning to digital entrepreneurship, utilizing online platforms to market these their products. Supported by community institutions, they receive financial aid, training, and access to virtual markets, showcasing how digital ventures empower women while also allowing them to fulfil their commitments to their families.

=== Female circumcision ===
The Dawoodi Bohra practice what they call khatna, khafd, or khafz, a practice critics consider female genital mutilation (FGM). The procedure is for the most part performed without anaesthesia by a traditional circumciser when girls reach their seventh year. Non-Bohra women who seek to marry into the community are also required to undergo it. There are no authoritative studies on the extent of the practice among the Bohra. A 1911 Bombay census of unknown reliability noted that they were performing clitoridectomy. According to a 1991 article in Manushi, the Bohra remove either the clitoral hood or the tip of the clitoris. Supporters of the practice say that the Bohra remove only the clitoral hood or perform symbolic nicking, and that it should be referred to as "female circumcision", not FGM. The United Nations definition of female genital mutilation includes removal of just the clitoral hood as type IA and symbolic nicking as type IV. In 2007 mutilations were found to be declining.

A qualitative study in 2018 carried out by WeSpeakOut, a group opposed to FGM, concluded that most Bohra girls experience Type I FGM, removal of the clitoral hood or clitoral glans. A gynaecologist who took part in the study examined 20 Bohra women and found that both the clitoris and clitoral hood had been cut in most cases. (Note: Sujaat Vali (The Clitoral Hood: A Contested Site, 2018): "Given that most girls are cut at age seven, without anesthesia, by traditional cutters, and the procedure happens in a minute or two, the operator cannot get enough separation between the clitoris and the skin surrounding the clitoris. So, usually they end up cutting the clitoris along with the skin covering the clitoris.") According to the Dawoodi Bohra Women's Association for Religious Freedom, the study's conclusions did not reflect the views of most Bohra women. They argue that female circumcision is a minor religious procedure involving only a small nick or excision on the clitoral hood or prepuce, which does not cause harm. The DBWRF position is that khafz is a centuries-old religious freedom and rite of passage for religious purity, comparable to male circumcision, and is not intended to control female sexuality. However, this position is contested by some members of the Bohra community and activists who oppose the practice.

Syedna's Saifuddin's administration has actively supported community members in their legal battles to exercise their religious freedoms, his UK-registered charity spent more than £800,000 on “costs incurred in defending four members of the Dawoodi Bohra congregation in Sydney in connection with female circumcision”. In 2018, the convictions of three members of the Bohra community, related to performing FGM on two girls, were overturned when the appeal court accepted that the tip of each girl's clitoris was still visible and had not been "mutilated"; the defence position was that only "symbolic khatna" had been performed. The High Court of Australia overturned that decision in October 2019, ruling that the phrase "otherwise mutilates" in Australian law does encompass cutting or nicking the clitoris. As a result, the convictions were upheld, and the defendants received custodial sentences of at least 11 months.

The community has successfully defended an indictment brought against the practice by the U.S. Department of Justice Criminal Division and the Federal Bureau of Investigation by arguing that the US federal statute was unconstitutional. Regarding this landmark judgement, Constitutional law scholar Alan Dershowitz, a professor emeritus of Harvard University and prominent Birmingham defense attorney Mayer Morganroth was hired by Dawat-e-Hadiyah "to protect the people charged and represent the religious organization" as per Morganroth.

== Social work and politics ==
[Do] not abhor any science or shun any book, and [do] not be unduly biased against any creed; for our philosophy and creed encompasses all creeds and all knowledge; [for] our creed consists of studying all existing things in their entirety, the physical and the intellectual, from their beginning to their end, their apparent and their hidden, their manifest and their concealed, with the aim to grasp their Truth, with the understanding that they emanate from one source, one cause, one world, [and] one soul, which encompasses their different essences, their diverse species, their various types, and their changing forms.

— Excerpt from the Epistles of Ikhwan al-Safa, an encyclopedic work on religion, sciences, and philosophy that permeates the Ismaili school of thought.

As a minority community, the Dawoodi Bohras follow a policy of cooperating with the incumbent government wherever they reside. This approach allows them to foster harmony and goodwill with all governments while staying out of political disputes. For instance, they have developed close ties with the Bharatiya Janata Party (BJP) in India, particularly with Prime Minister Narendra Modi. Similarly, they maintain cordial relations with the Shiv Sena in Maharashtra.

The community's stance, in line with sunnah, has been to be loyal to one's country of residence. As a migratory minority community, Dawoodi Bohras participate in culture and society, but to the Epistles of Ikhwan al-Safa. Their belief is that every religion is related to one another, that all of creation shares the same purpose. True fulfillment is achieved through harmonious living and skillfully managing relationships to avoid conflicts.

=== The Burhani Foundation ===
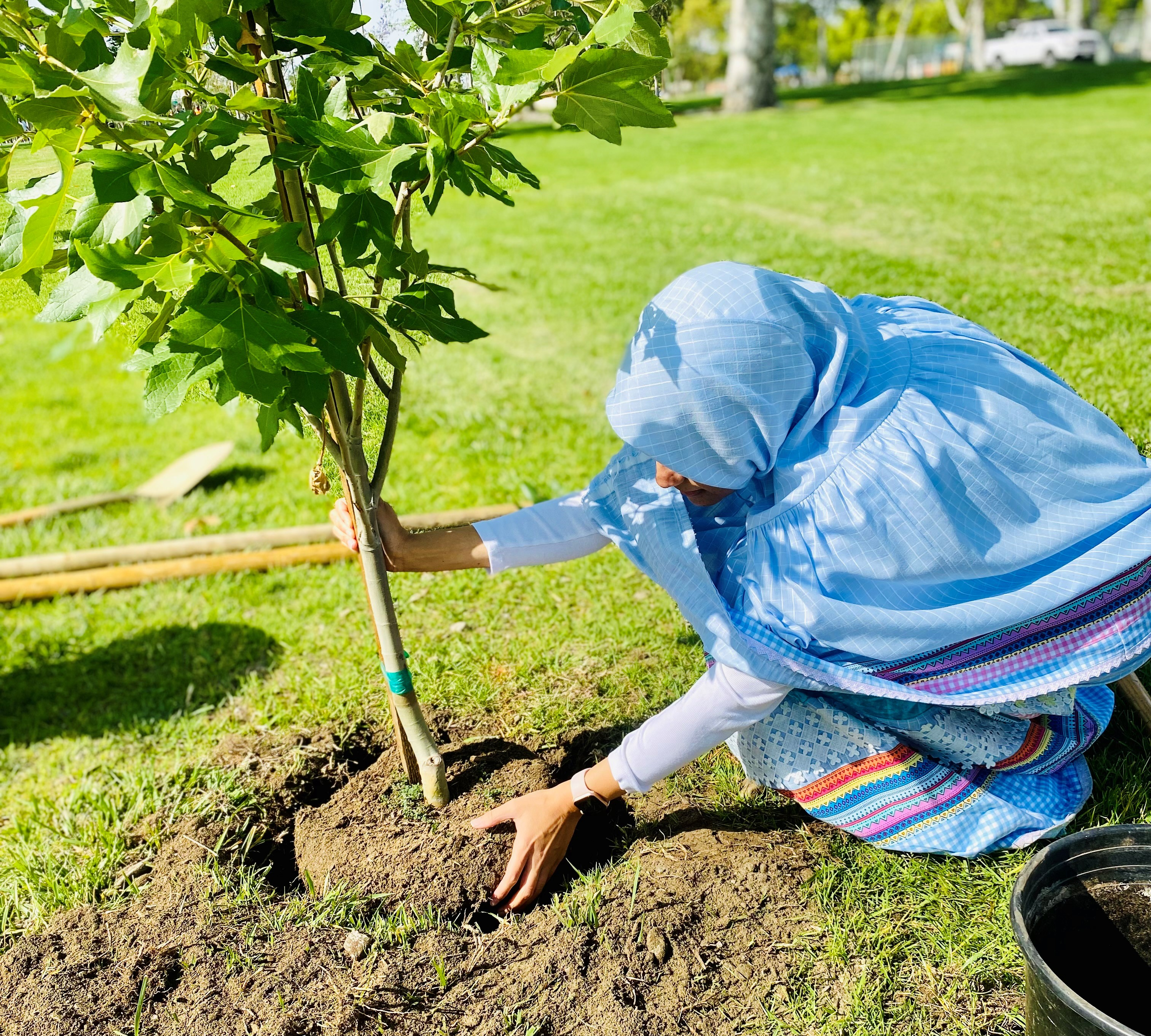
A Dawoodi Bohra woman planting a tree sapling as part of the community's initiative for environmental conservation.

In 1991, Mohammed Burhanuddin established the Burhani Foundation, a charitable trust for environmental awareness, conservation of biological diversity, effective utilisation of resources, pollution control, and other related cause. In 2017, Mufaddal Saifuddin, Burhanuddin's successor, initiated a worldwide program to plant 200,000 tree saplings. In 2018, the Bohras, together with Champion of the Earth, launched Turning the Tide, a campaign to remove plastic from oceans, rivers, and beaches. On 6 November 2023, ahead of the COP28 World leaders summit, Shahzada Husain Burhanuddin on behalf of his Father Syedna Mufaddal Saifuddin, attended the COP28 Global Faith leaders summit among 28 Faith leaders in Abu Dhabi and signed a joint appeal to take meaningful action in addressing climate crisis.

=== Zero food waste ===
Under the aegis of FMB, the Dana Committee (lit. 'food grain committee') aims to eliminate food wastage. As of 2021, the committee has 7000 volunteers across 40 countries. After congregations, these volunteers collect leftovers, consume them or distribute them to the deprived. To prevent wastage of food due to excess cooking or poor turnout, the committee uses AI predictive tools and mobile RSVP apps. Before a meal commences, volunteers remind attendees of their responsibility as Muslims (Note: The Quran and the Hadiths inform Muslims to not be wasteful with food.) in ensuring no food goes to waste. The Bohras also participate in the United Nations' annual World Food Day campaigns.

In September 2018, the Golden Book of World Records recognized and awarded the Dawoodi Bohra community for undertaking the largest zero-waste religious event as part of the community's Ashara Mubaraka sermons in Indore. The event was attended by 150,000 Bohras, who had gathered in Indore to commemorate Ashara Mubaraka with Mufaddal Saifuddin, the 53rd Da'i al-Mutlaq. This zero-waste policy was also adopted at the 2019 Ashara Mubaraka in Colombo. Dana Committee volunteers helped with portion control and distributed leftover food to the disadvantaged. In line with the UAE's policy to mark 2023 as the Year of Sustainability, the 2023 Ashara Mubaraka in Dubai, attended by more than 75,000, also adopted a zero food wastage policy. The Ashara Mubaraka congregations also aligned with the UAE's waste-to-energy initiative, in which organic waste collected during meals is converted into energy.

=== Other initiatives ===
Project Rise

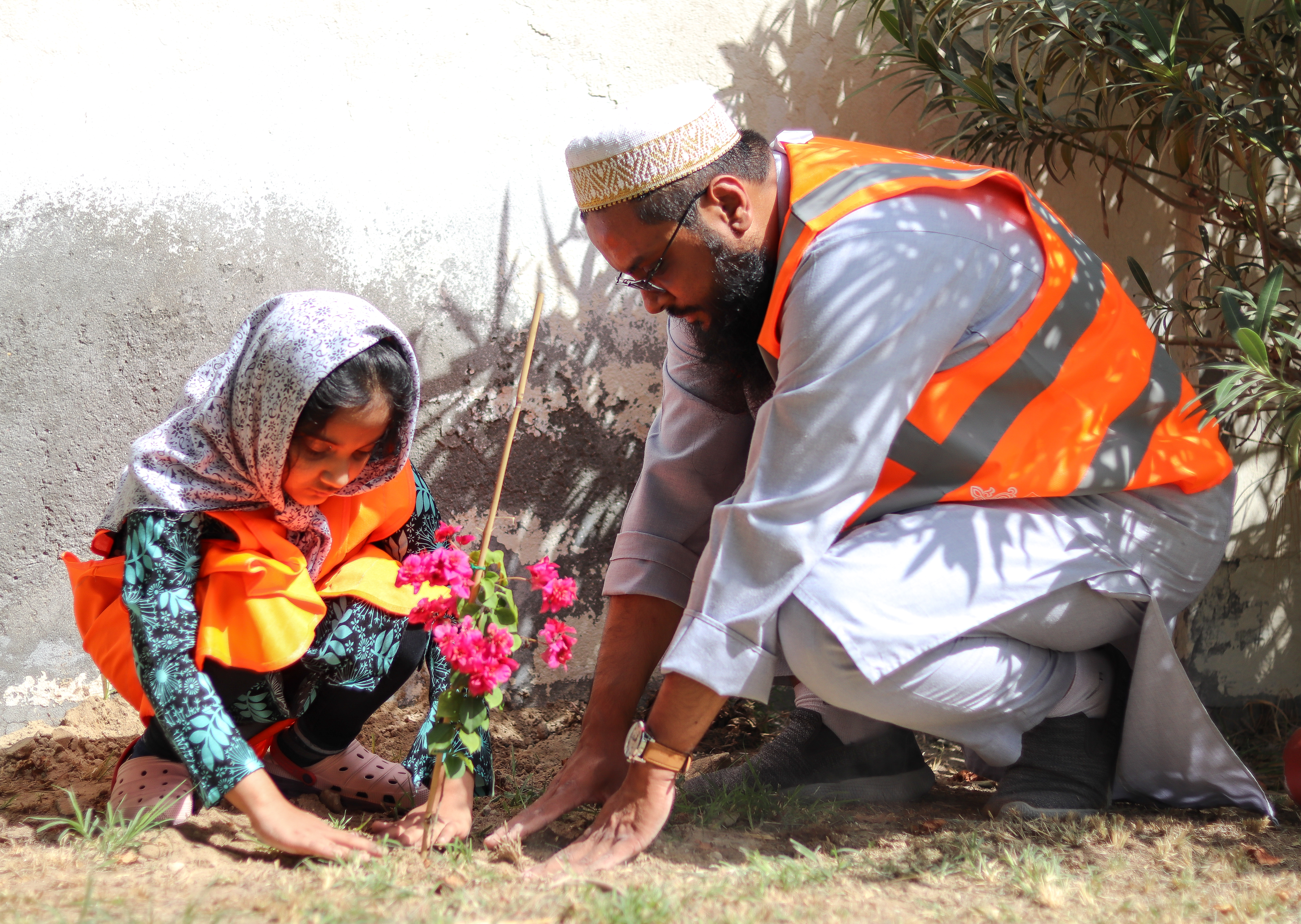
A Dawoodi Bohra child and adult planting a tree as part of the community’s commitment to environmental conservation.

In June 2018, the Bohra community launched Project Rise, a philanthropy programme focused on the marginalized and the poor. Their first initiative, undertaken in collaboration with Action Against Hunger, sought to address malnutrition among those living in Palghar and Govandi districts of Maharashtra, India. During the 2019 floods, volunteers sent aid to the Indian states of Kerala, Karnataka, Maharashtra, and Gujarat; while during the 2020 lockdown in India, volunteers distributed food packets among the poor. In 2020, Narendra Modi, the Prime Minister of India acknowledged the community's social service. In 2019 and 2020, volunteers in North America marked United Nations World Food Day by donating to local food banks. Since then, based on Islamic traditions of philanthropy, (Note: Project Rise is chartered to help eradicate poverty and hunger, improve health and education, empower women, avoid waste, and preserve the environment – align with the United Nations Sustainable Development Goals. Bohras claim to follow this tradition of charity and activism for centuries.) Project Rise has expanded to launch programs that focus on healthcare, nutrition, sanitation and hygiene, and environmental conservation. As part of these drives, volunteers attempt to raise the standard of living of the disadvantaged through revamped housing, access to food, and improved well-being.

=== Bhendi Bazaar cluster redevelopment ===
In 2009, Mohammed Burhanuddin, the 52nd Da'i al-Mutlaq, established Saifee Burhani Upliftment Trust (SBUT) to undertake one of urban India's largest makeover projects believed to impact lives of around 20,000 people. Its mandate was to rebuild Bhendi Bazaar—a decrepit, under-developed, and dense muslim-majority locale in South Bombay. The redevelopment project spans over an area of 16.5 acres comprising 250 decrepit buildings, 3,200 families, and 1,250 shops.The area is being transformed into a healthy and sustainable development comprising 11 new towers, wider roads, modern infrastructure, open spaces and highly visible commercial areas. Relocated residential and commercial tenants will own their new premises at no cost to them. Due to the scope of the project, the largest "cluster redevelopment" project in India, it has faced logistical and regulatory challenges, resulting in several delays at an estimated cost of $550 million (₹4000 crores).

Starting in 2010, the trust began building transit homes near Mazagaon. In 2012, the trust relocated tenants and demolished buildings it had acquired. More transit homes were built in Sion, Ghodapdeo, and Sewri. In early 2016, Mufaddal Saifuddin laid foundation for Clusters I and III. In 2020, 600 residents and 128 shop owners were relocated to the completed twin towers called Al Saadah, marking completion of the project's first phase.

After completing the first phase of the project SBUT initiated construction work on the second phase of the project in February 2021.

Syedna Mufaddal Saifuddin inaugurated the newly reconstructed Saifee Masjid and its complex on the eve of Milad al Nabi in September 2023.This complex known as Sector 1 was demolished and redeveloped with modern sustainable amenities and a commercial shopping arcade.

== See also ==
- Succession to 52nd Dai al-Mutlaq
- List of Dai of Dawoodi Bohra
- Progressive Dawoodi Bohra
