= Badr al-Din =

Badr al-Din (Arabic: بدر الدين, lit. 'full moon of the Faith') is a Muslim Family name composed of the elements Badr and ad-Din.

Variants include Badreddine, Badruddin, Bedrettin, Bedretdin.

It may refer to:

== Given name ==
- Sheikh Bedreddin (1359–1420), revolutionary theologian and preacher against the Ottoman Empire
- Badruddin Ajmal (born 1955), Indian Bengali politician
- Badruddin Amiruldin (born 1950), Malaysian politician
- Badr al-Din al-Ayni (1360–1453), Sunni Islamic scholar of the Hanafi madh'hab
- Badradine Belloumou (born 1984), French/Algerian footballer
- Bader Eldin Abdalla Galag (born 1981), Sudanese footballer
- Badr Al Din Abu Ghazi (1920–1983), Egyptian art critic
- Badr al-Din Hilali (1470–1529), Persian poet
- Badruddin Jamaluddin Kazi, real name of Johnny Walker (Indian actor) (1926–2003), Indian movie comedian
- Badar Uddin Ahmed Kamran (1951–2020), Bangladeshi politician
- Badr al-Din Lu'lu' (1178–1259), successor to the Zangid rulers of Mosul
- Badreddine Missaoui, Tunisian politician
- Badr al-Din Solamish (1272–1291), Sultan of Egypt
- Badruddin Tyabji (1844–1906), the third President of the Indian National Congress
- Badruddin Umar (1931–2025), Bangladeshi Marxist–Leninist historian
- Badr al-Dīn ibn Jamaʿah (1241–1333), Shafi'i jurist of Mamluk Sultanate

== Middle name ==
- Ibrahim Badreldin-Sayed (born 1927), Egyptian tennis player

== Family name ==
- al-Hasan Badr al-Din I (died 1418), leader of the Tayyibi Isma'ili community
- al-Hasan Badr al-Din II (died 1512), leader of the Tayyibi Isma'ili community

== Surname ==
- Amber-Rose Badrudin (born 2000), English businessowner
- Mustafa Badreddine (1961–2016), military leader of Hezbollah
- Rafid Badr Al-Deen (born 1976), Iraqi footballer

== See also ==
- Bedrettin
- Badrudduja (disambiguation)
- Sultan Mahmud Badaruddin II
