= Idris Imad al-Din =

Da'i al-Mutlaq of Tayyibi Isma'ilis from 1428 to 1468

- إدريس عماد الدين
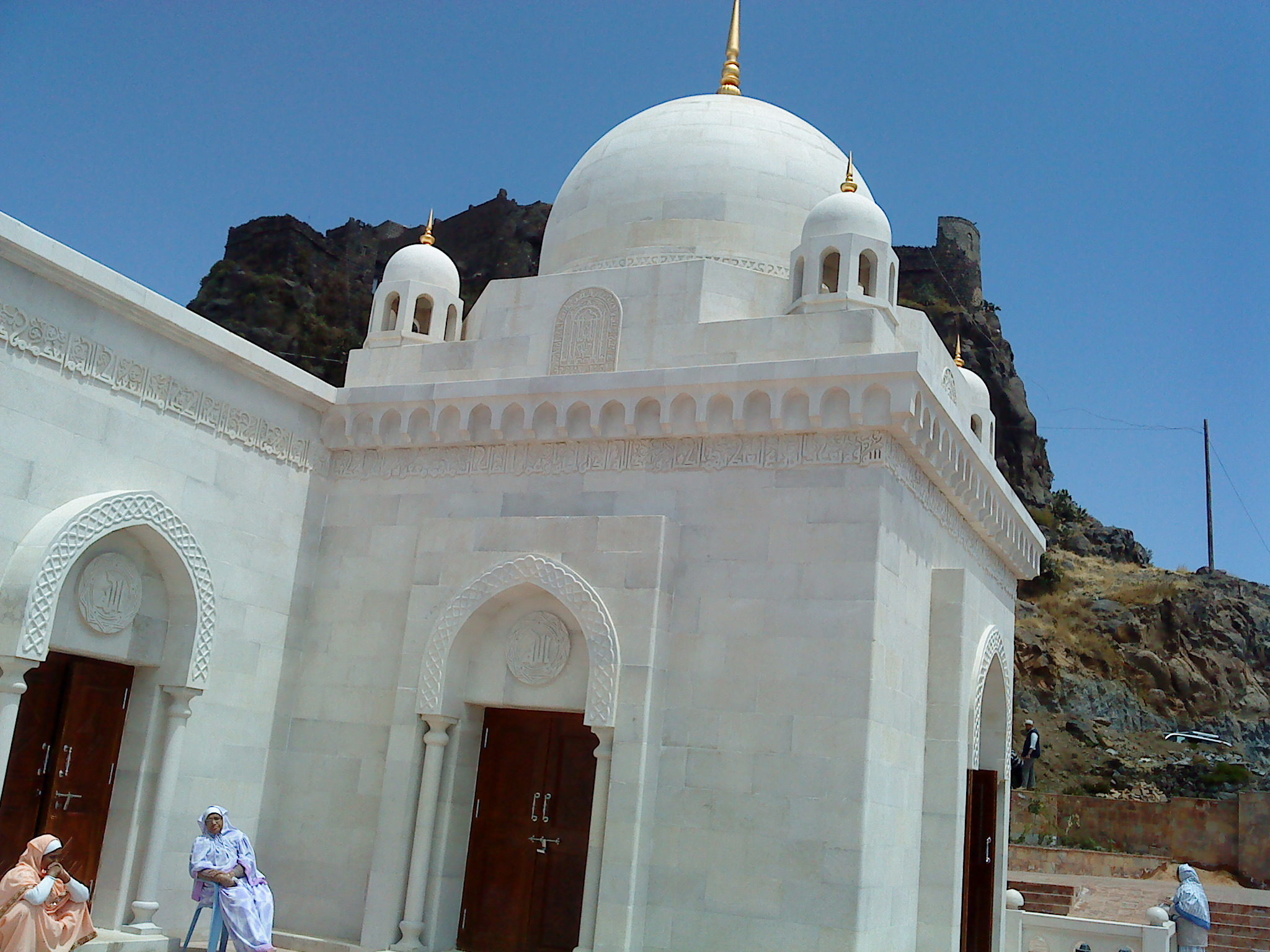
- Mausoleum of Idris Imad al-Din in Shibam in 2011

Da'i al-Mutlaq
- In office 1428–1468
- Preceded by: Ali Shams al-Din II
- Succeeded by: al-Hasan Badr al-Din II

Personal life
- Born: 1392; Shibam, Yemen
- Died: 10 June 1468; Shibam, Yemen
- Resting place: Shibam, Yemen
- Parent: Al-Hasan Badr al-Din I (father)

Religious life
- Religion: Shia Islam
- Sect: Tayyibi Isma'ilism

Idris Imad al-Din ibn al-Hasan al-Qurashi (Arabic: إدريس عماد الدين بن الحسن القرشي, romanized: ʾIdrīs ʿImād al-Dīn ibn al-Ḥasan al-Qurashī; 1392 – 10 June 1468) was the 19th Da'i al-Mutlaq of Tayyibi Isma'ilis from 1428 to 1468. A major religious and political leader in 15th-century Yemen, as well as a notable theologian, Idris was also an important medieval Isma'ili historian whose work is fundamental for the history of the Fatimid Caliphate and the Isma'ili communities in Yemen.

== Life ==
Born in 1392 at Shibam in northern Yemen, Idris was descended from the Banu al-Walid al-Anf family, of the Quraysh tribe. The family had provided the Tayyibi Isma'ili head missionaries (da'is) in Yemen reaching back to the early 13th century. The full title of these missionaries, Da'i al-Mutlaq (lit. 'absolute/unrestricted missionary') signified their position as the de facto leaders of the Tayyibi community in their capacity as vicegerents of the hidden imam. This authority extended over not only Yemen, but the Tayyibi community in India as well. Idris' grandfather Abdallah Fakhr al-Din was the sixteenth Da'i al-Mutlaq, followed by his father al-Hasan Badr al-Din I, and after his death in 1418 by his uncle Ali Shams al-Din II, who died in 1428.

As a youth, Idris received a thorough education, and was active in the governance of the Tayyibi community. When his uncle died in 1428, he succeeded him as the nineteenth Da'i al-Mutlaq, a position he would hold throughout the remainder of his life. His first residence was the citadel of Haraz. Like his predecessors, he was allied with the Rasulids of Zabid against the Zaydi imams of Sanaa. With the Rasulid al-Malik al-Zahir (r. 1428–1439) he repeatedly fought against the Zaydi imam al-Mansur Ali (r. 1391–1436), and recaptured numerous fortresses from Zaydi control. When the Rasulids were replaced by the Tahirids in 1454, Idris maintained friendly relations with the new rulers of Zabid, the Tahirid brothers Amir (r. 1454–1460) and Ali (r. 1460–1479). After a disastrous plague in 1436/7, which cost him several relatives, Idris returned to his native Shibam. The Sunni Bohra break off from the Dawoodi Bohra during the leadership of Idris.

Idris paid particular attention to the missionary efforts in western India, and contributed to the success of Tayyibi missionaries in Gujarat. According to the later Indian Tayyibi scholars Khawj ibn Malak and Shaykh Qutb, it was Idris who first planned to move the seat of the Tayyibi missionary movement from Yemen to India, although in the event this did not take place until a century after his death on 10 June 1468. His sons, al-Hasan Badr al-Din II, and al-Husayn Husam al-Din, and then his grandsons, Ali Shams al-Din III and Muhammad Izz al-Din I, succeeded him as Da'i al-Mutlaq. Muhammad Izz al-Din I, the 23rd Da'i al-Mutlaq, was the last of his line, and on his death the first Indian, Yusuf ibn Sulayman, was nominated as his successor.

The mausoleum of Idris in Shibam was reconstructed in 2010 by the 52nd Da'i al-Mutlaq of the Dawoodi Bohra branch of Tayyibi Isma'ilism, and is a frequent pilgrimage destination for Bohra faithful from both Yemen and India.

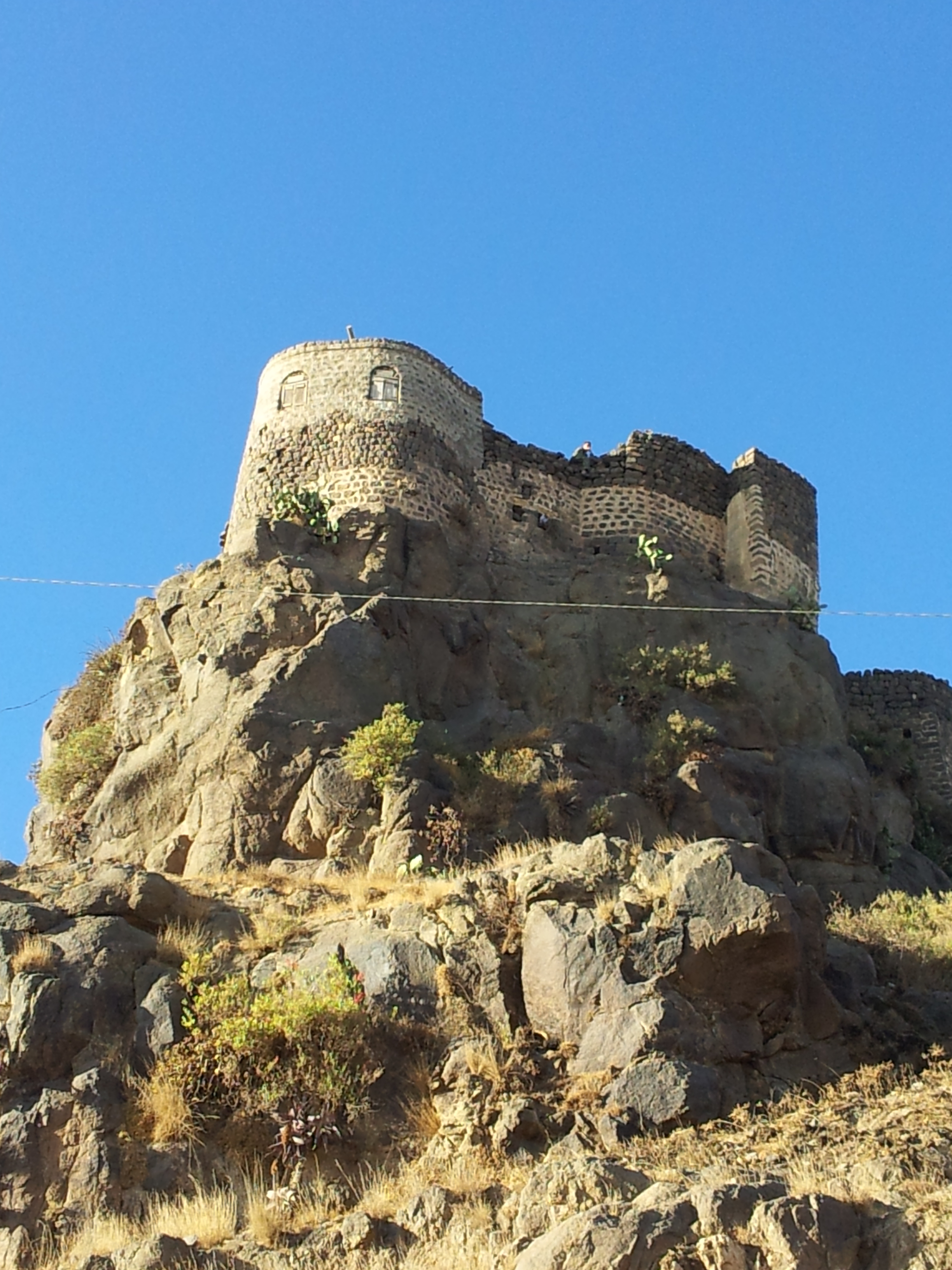
Citadel of Idris, Shibam

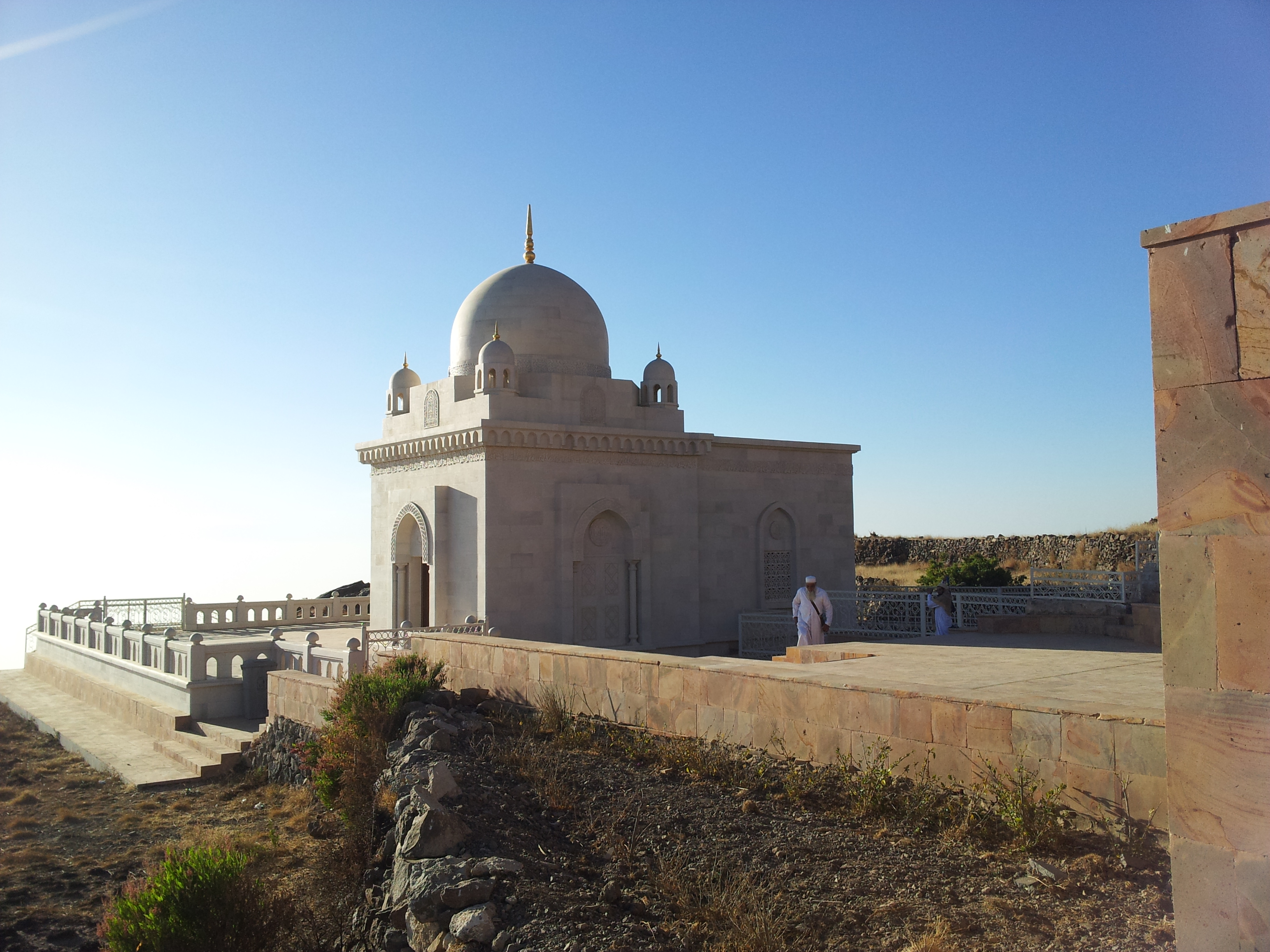
Idris' reconstructed mausoleum in 2013

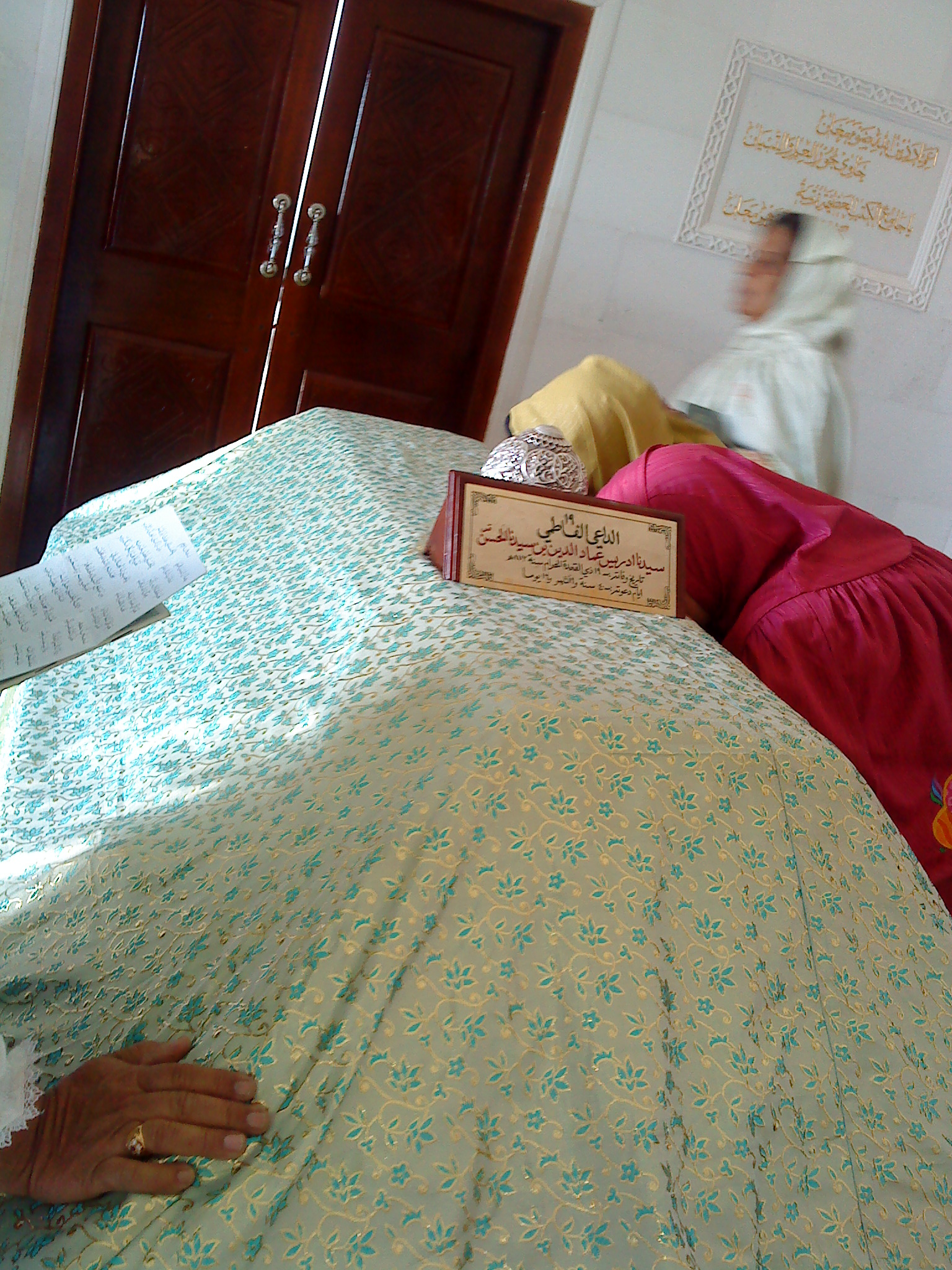
Tomb of Idris in 2011

== Works ==
Alongside his religious and political duties, Idris was also a dedicated scholar and prolific writer. His books "would become foundational works of the Ṭayyibi daʿwa". His favourite writing spot, next to the lake Birkat Jawjab near Shibam, is still pointed out to visitors today. The 16th-century Tayyibi scholar Hasan ibn Nuh ascribes eleven works to Idris. The modern historian Ayman Fuʾad Sayyid enumerates eleven whose authorship is certain, and three more where it is attributed to Idris, but doubtful.

=== Historical works ===
His main work is the seven-volume Uyun al-akhbar ("Flowing springs of historical reports"), a history of Islam from Muhammad, through the 21 Isma'ili Imams up to the end of the Fatimid Caliphate, as well as the start of the Tayyibi da'wa in Yemen under the Sulayhid dynasty. In it, Idris made use of a large number of Isma'ili and non-Isma'ili sources, some of which do no longer survive. The only general history of Isma'ilism actually written by an Isma'ili author during the Middle Ages, this work has established him as the "most famous Isma'ili historian", according to Farhad Daftary, and provides a unique Isma'ili perspective on the history of the Fatimid Caliphate and its proxies in Yemen. Along with the work of his Egyptian contemporary, al-Maqrizi, the Uyun al-akhbar is "arguably the most detailed source of Fatimid history".

The Uyun al-akhbar has been published in a number of critical editions:

- Volumes 4–6, edited by Mustafa Ghalib, Dar al-Andalus, Beirut 1975–1984
- Volume 5, focusing on the Fatimids, edited by Farhat Dashrawi, Tunis 1979 and again by Muhammad al-Ya'llawi, Dar al-Gharb al-Islami, Beirut 1985
- All seven volumes by Ahmad Chleilat, Mahmoud Fakhoury, Yousef S. Fattoum, Ma'moun Sagherji, and Ayman Fu'ad Sayyid, London and Damascus 2007–2010
- Excerpts from volumes 5 and 6 were translated into English by Shainool Jiwa in The Founder of Cairo. The Fatimid Imam-Caliph al-Muʿizz and his Era, I.B. Tauris, London and New York 2013
- Volume 7, with a summarized English translation, by Ayman Fu'ad Sayyid with Paul Walker and Maurice Pomerantz, as The Fatimids and their successors in Yaman: The History of an Islamic Community, I.B. Tauris (in association with the Institute of Ismaili Studies), London and New York 2002

The Uyun al-akhbar is complemented by two smaller works, the two-volume Nuzhat al-afkar ("A promenade for minds" or "The pleasure of the thoughts"), and its continuation, the Rawdat al-akhbar ("A garden of historical reports/information"), which specifically focus on the Tayyibi community in Yemen from the collapse of the Sulayhid dynasty to Idris' own day.

=== Theological works ===
Among his theological works, the Zahr al-Ma'ani ("Flowers of the meanings"), a treatise on Tayyibi esoteric doctrine (haqa'iq), stands out as the "high mark of Tayyibi writings" (Daftary). The metaphysical ideas of the 11th-century da'i Hamid al-Din al-Kirmani provided particular inspiration to Idris. He also composed six shorter theological diatribes: one in question-and-answer format on theological questions; a theological exegesis of aspects connected to the Islamic calendar; a treatise on strictly keeping the full fast of Ramadan; a refutation of a Zaydi theological treatise; a polemic treatise against an atheist referred to only as "The Camel"; and a refutation of the practice of some Indians of watching the moon to determine the start and end of Ramadan.

Finally, he was the author of a diwan, in which he emulated the Fatimid-era poet al-Mu'ayyad al-Shirazi. The subjects of his poems were mostly religious, offering praise to Muhammad, Ali and his family, the Isma'ili imams. Some deal with issues of doctrine, but others express his own spiritual beliefs.

== Sources ==
- Daftary, Farhad (2007). The Ismāʿı̄lı̄s: Their History and Doctrines (Second ed.). Cambridge: Cambridge University Press. ISBN 978-0-521-61636-2.
- Daftary, Farhad (2015). "Idris 'Imad al-Din, Sayyid". In Leaman, Oliver (ed.). The Biographical Encyclopedia of Islamic Philosophy. Bloomsbury Academic. pp. 234–236. ISBN 978-1-4725-6944-8.
- Jiwa, Shainool (2013). The Founder of Cairo: The Fatimid Imam-Caliph al-Mu'izz and his Era. London and New York: I.B. Tauris. ISBN 978-0-8577-2223-2.
- Qutbuddin, Tahera (2018). "Idrīs ʿImād al-Dīn". In Fleet, Kate; Krämer, Gudrun; Matringe, Denis; Nawas, John; Rowson, Everett (eds.). Encyclopaedia of Islam (3rd ed.). Brill Online. doi:10.1163/1573-3912_ei3_COM_32368. ISSN 1873-9830.
- Sayyid, Ayman Fuʾād; Walker, Paul E.; Pomerantz, Maurice A. (2002). The Fatimids and their Successors in Yaman: The History of an Islamic Community. London and New York: I.B. Tauris. ISBN 978-0-8577-1258-5.

Shia Islam titles
Idris Imad al-Din Banu al-Walid al-Anf Born: 1392 Died: 10 June 1468
Preceded by Ali Shams al-Din II	Da'i al-Mutlaq of Tayyibi Isma'ilism; 1428–1468	Succeeded by al-Hasan Badr al-Din II
