= Ali Shams al-Din I =

Ali Shams al-Din ibn Ibrahim (Arabic: علي شمس الدين بن إبراهيم, romanized: ʿAlī Shams al-Dīn ibn Ibrāhīm) was the thirteenth Tayyibi Isma'ili Dāʿī al-Muṭlaq in Yemen, from 1329 to his death in 1345.

== Family ==
Syedna Ali Shamsuddin was the son of 11th Dai Syedna Ibrahim ibn al-Husayn (Ibn al-Walid).

== Life ==
During the lifetime of his father, Syedna Ali had acquired Hisne Kawkaban for a huge sum of money and had accommodated his wife over here. During his tenure, the Ashraaf from the sons of Tajuddin bin Yahya bin Hamza marched to the fortress of Dhu Marmar and took control of it. Syedna Ali mobilized a large army and sent it to confront the invader.

Allied with some of the Banu Hamdan tribe, he fought against the Zaydi imams. In 1332, his forces seized the fortress of Dhu Marmar.

== Lineage ==
His son Abdallah became the 16th Dāʿī al-Muṭlaq in 1378.

== Gallery ==
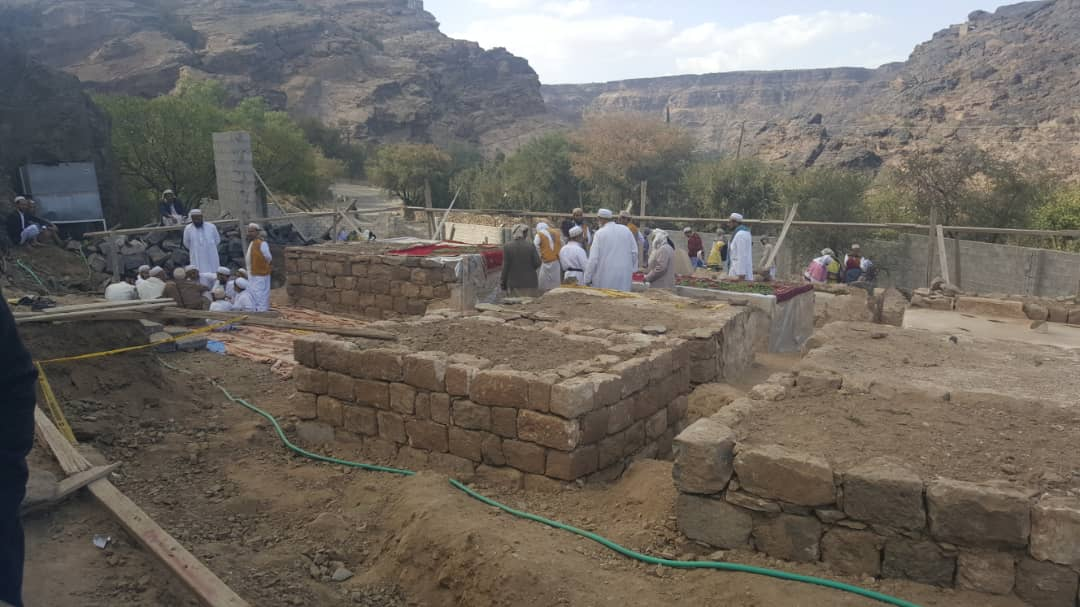
Graves of the three Dāʿīs being uncovered at Hisn Af'ida

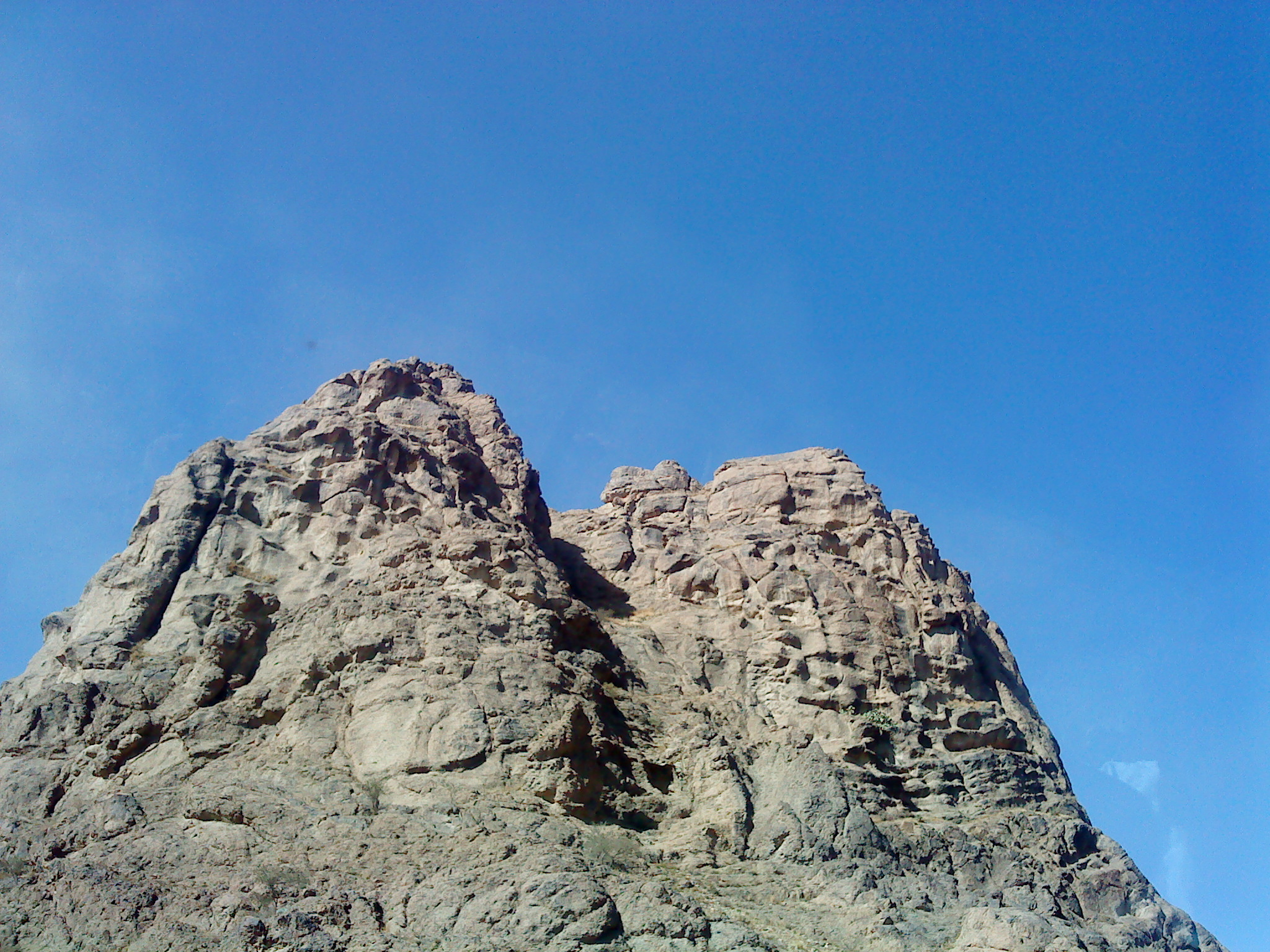
Hisn Af'ida hill, near al-Maḩārīq, Sanaa, where the graves of the 11th, 12th, 13th and 15th Dāʿī are located

== Sources ==
- Daftary, Farhad (2007). The Ismāʿı̄lı̄s: Their History and Doctrines (Second ed.). Cambridge: Cambridge University Press. ISBN 978-0-521-61636-2.

Shia Islam titles
Ali Shams al-Din I Dā'ī al-Mutlaq Died: 1354 CE Hisn Af'ida hill, near al-Maḩārīq, Sanaa
Preceded by Muhammad ibn Hatim	13th Dā'ī al-Mutlaq : 1329–1345 CE	Succeeded by Abd al-Muttalib
