= Ibrahim ibn al-Husayn (Ibn al-Walid) =

Ibrahim ibn al-Husayn ibn Ali ibn Muhammad ibn al-Walid (Arabic: إبراهيم بن الحسين بن علي بن محمد بن الوليد, romanized: Ibrāhīm ibn al-Ḥusayn ibn ʿAlī ibn Muḥammad ibn al-Walīd) was the eleventh Tayyibi Isma'ili Da'i al-Mutlaq in Yemen, from 1287 to his death in 1328.

== Life ==
Ibrahim was a member of the Banu al-Walid al-Anf family, that dominated the office of Da'i al-Mutlaq almost continuously in the 13th to early 16th centuries. He was the son of the eighth Da'i, Al-Husayn ibn Ali, and brother of the ninth Da'i, Ali ibn al-Husayn. Ibrahim moved his seat from Sanaa to the fortress of Af'ida, and in 1325 he took over the town of Kawkaban, where he started gathering military forces to oppose the Zaydi imams.

He was succeeded by Muhammad ibn Hatim (1327–1328), who in turn was succeeded by Ibrahim's son Ali Shams al-Din I.

== Tomb ==
His grave, along with those of the 12th and 13th Da'is, were hidden and unknown until recently, when the archaeological authority of Yemen, along with Dawoodi Bohras living there, located them on Hisn Af'ida. On 25 November 2018, Mufaddal Saifuddin, the 53rd Dāʿī al-Muṭlaq, unveiled its existence. A mausoleum will soon be made and declared open.

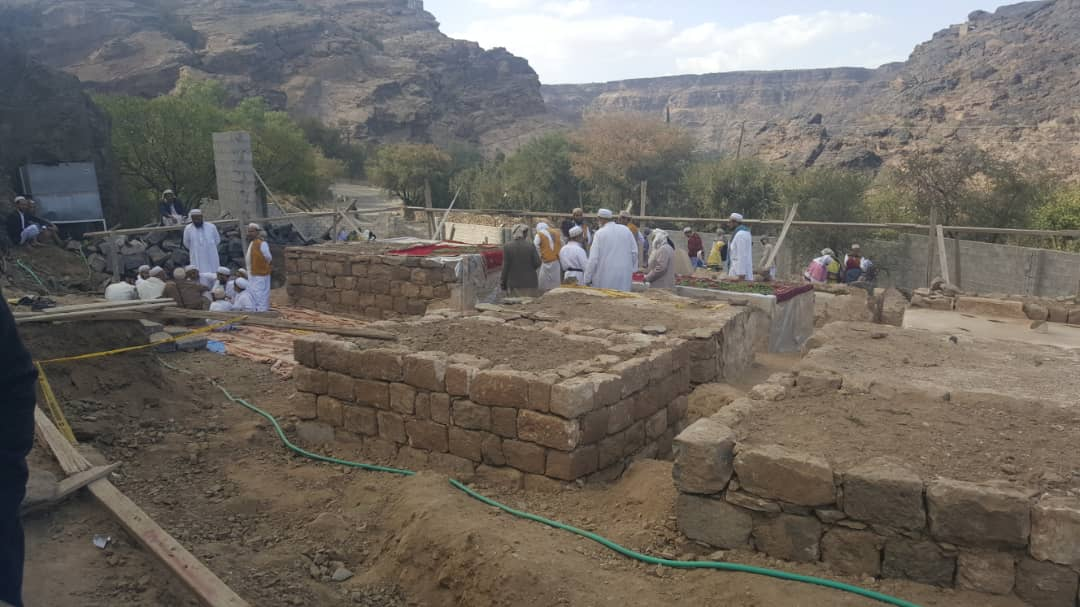
Graves of the three Da'is being uncovered at Hisn Af'ida

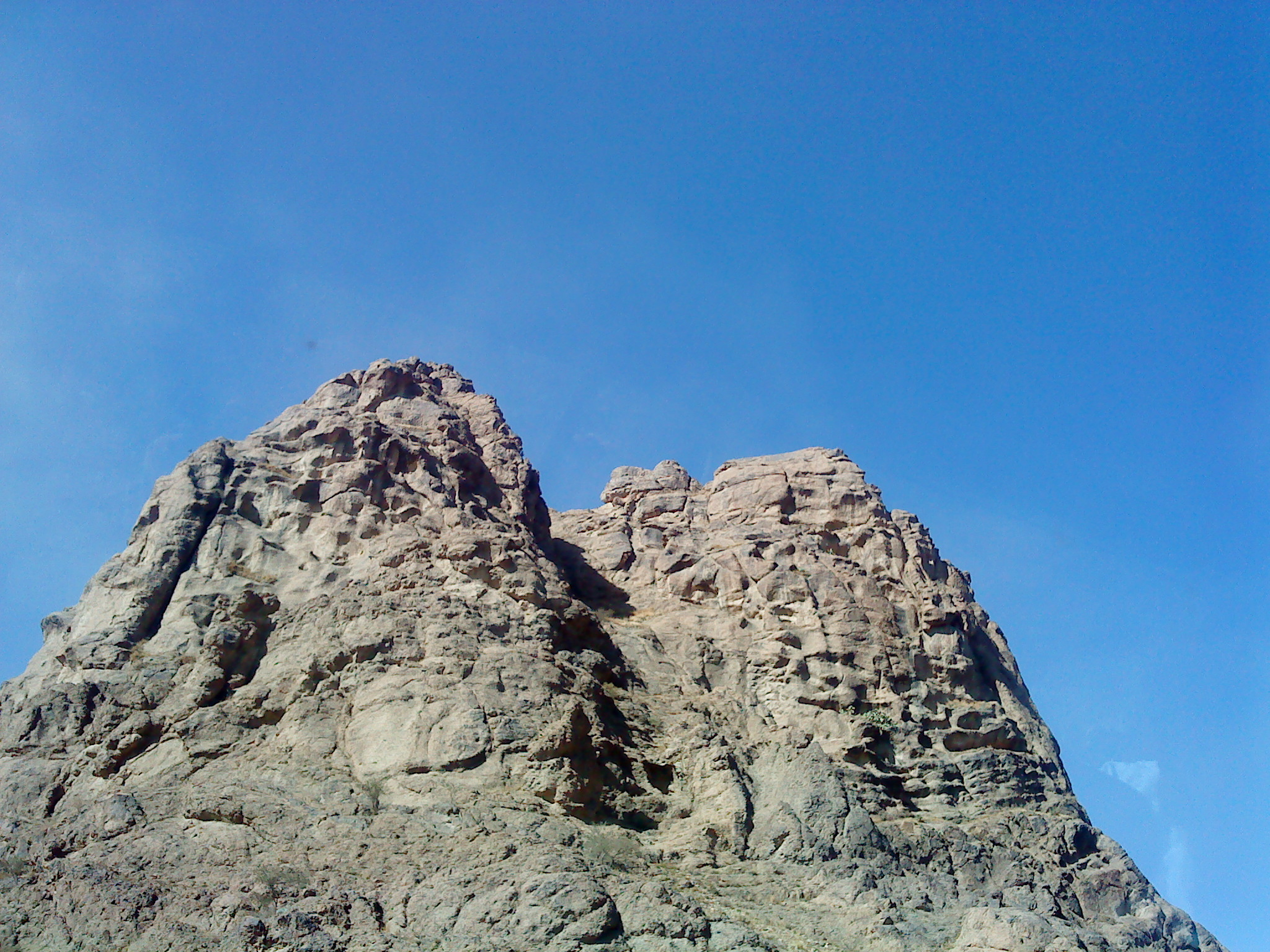
Hisn Af'ida hill, near al-Mahariq, Sanaa, where the graves of the 11th, 12th, 13th and 15th Da'i are located

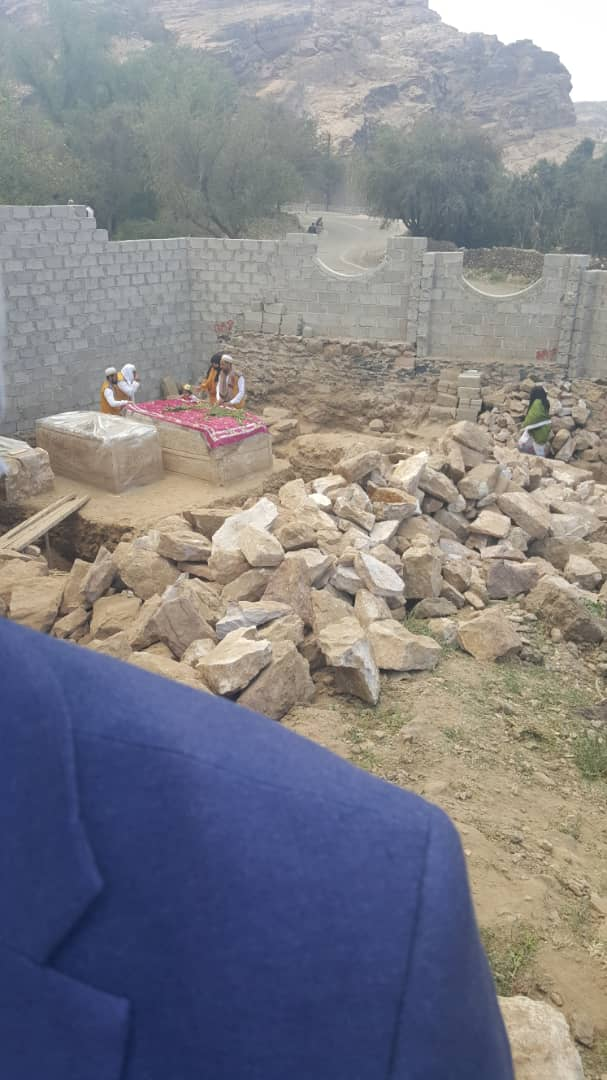
Another view of the graves

== Sources ==
- Daftary, Farhad (2007). The Ismāʿı̄lı̄s: Their History and Doctrines (Second ed.). Cambridge: Cambridge University Press. ISBN 978-0-521-61636-2.

Shia Islam titles
Ibrahim ibn al-Husayn (Ibn al-Walid) Banu al-Walid al-Anf Died: 1328 CE
| Preceded by Ali ibn al-Husayn | Da'i al-Mutlaq of Tayyibi Isma'ilism; 1287–1328 CE | Succeeded by Muhammad ibn Hatim |
