= Abdallah Fakhr al-Din =

16th Dai of Tayyibi Isma'ilism

- عبدالله فخرالدين
- Died: 16 February 1407
- Resting place: Zimarmar Fort
- Occupation: 16th Dai of Tayyibi Isma'ilism
- Children: 5
- Father: Muhammad ibn Hatim

Within the Islamic history of Yemen, Abdallah Fakhr al-Din (Arabic: عبدالله فخرالدين, romanized: ʿAbdallāh Fakhr al-Dīn) was the 16th Dai of Tayyibi Isma'ilism (died on 9 Ramadan al-Moazzam 809 AH/16 February 1407 AD, Zimarmar, Yemen). He succeeded the 15th Dai Abbas ibn Muhammad to the religious post.

== Family ==
Syedna Abdallah was the son of Ali bin Syedna Muhammad, son of the 12th Dai. His sons were Syedi Husain (died in 1394), Syedi Abdul Muttalib Najmuddin (died in 1408 at Taiz), Syedna Al-Hasan Badr al-Din I, Syedi Ahmed (died in 1418) and Syedna Ali Shams al-Din II.

== Life ==
Syedna Abdallah was a warrior who acquired the fortress of Hamdha and Shanasib and annexed them.

Abdallah Fakhr al-Din became Da'i al-Mutlaq in 779 AH/1345AD. His period of Dawat was from 779-809AH (1377-1406 AD) for about 29 years (Hijri), 11 months, 1 day. The Zaidi Imam Al-Mansur Ali bin Salah ad-Din persecuted the Taiyabi Ismailis based at Dhumarmar/Zimarmar.

His Mazoon (Associate) was: Syedna Ali ash-Shaibani, Syedna Husain and Syedna Hasan Mukasir: Syedi Abdul Muttalib bin Syedna Abdullah

== Death ==
Syedna conferred nass upon 17th Dai al-Hasan Badr al-Din I - his son after passing away at the age of 85. The grave of the dai along with 14th and 17th Dai (big square platform) are at Zimarmar Fort which is on the top of a hill. The small square is grave of their associate (mazoon). On the hill top there still exist the remains of the Mosque, buildings and water reservoirs.

== Gallery ==
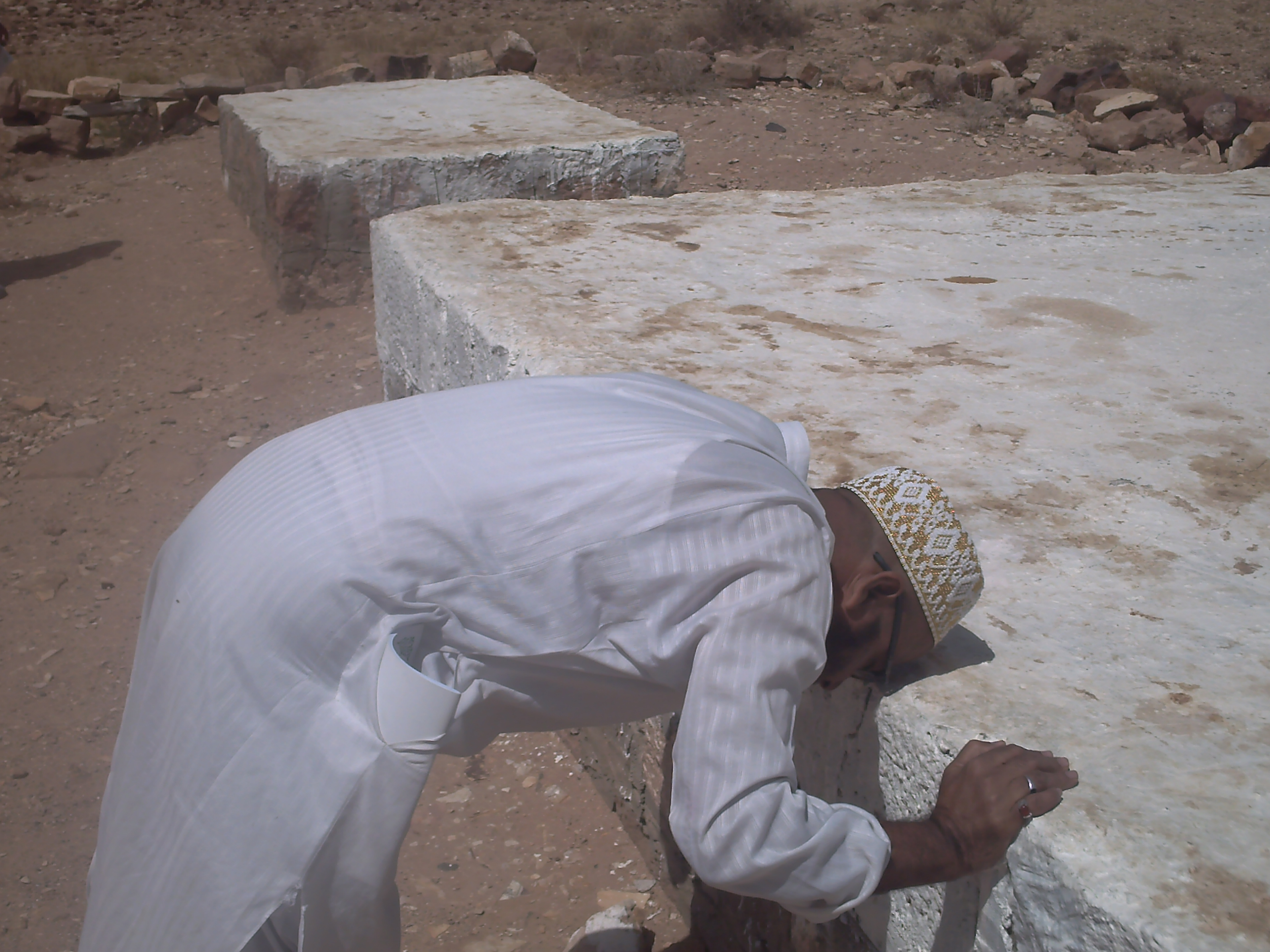
Grave of the 14th, 16th and 17th dai (the bigger one) Zimarmar fort, Yemen

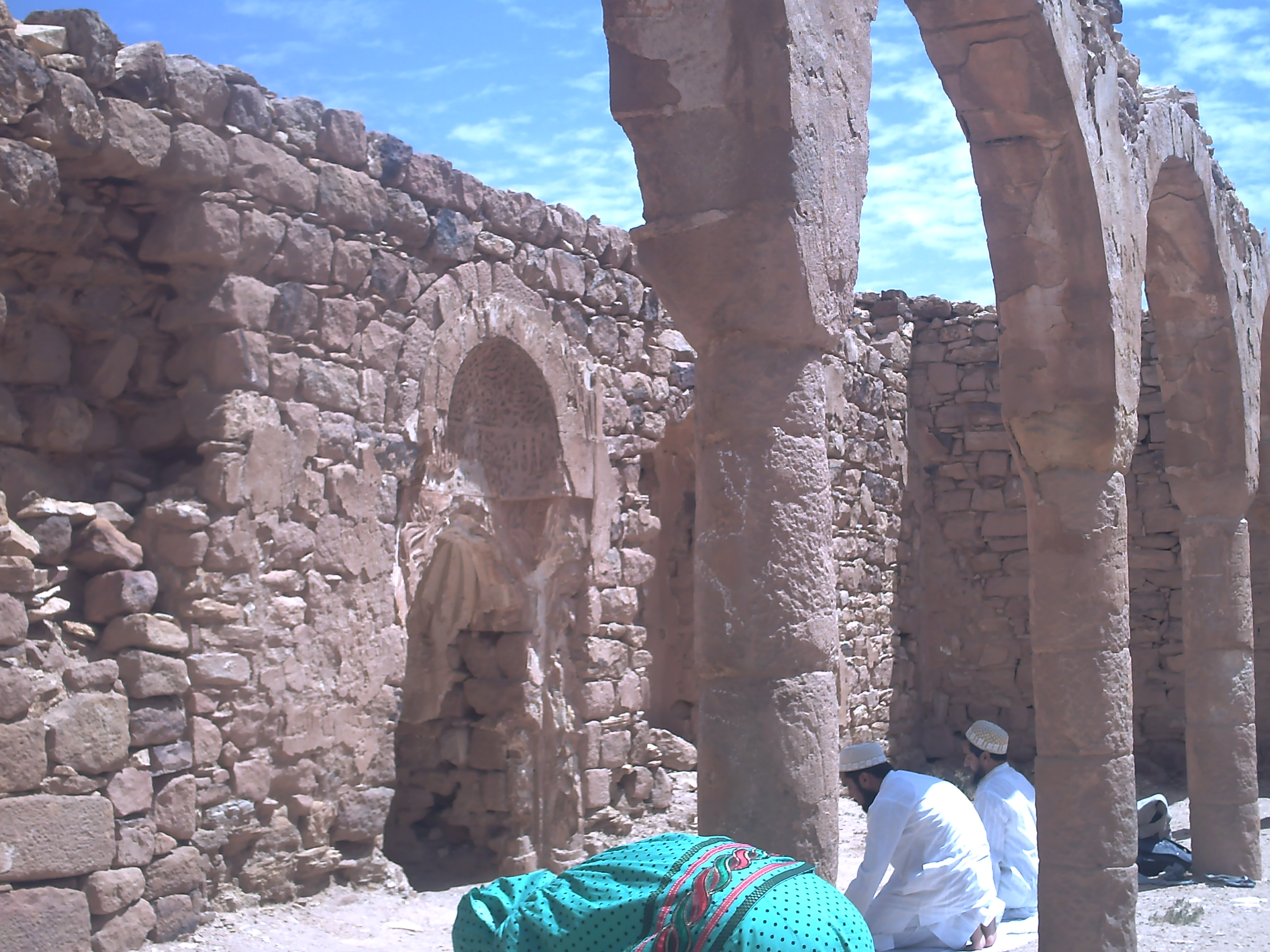
Masjid-e-Aqdam, Mosque of dai at Zimarmar fort, Yemen

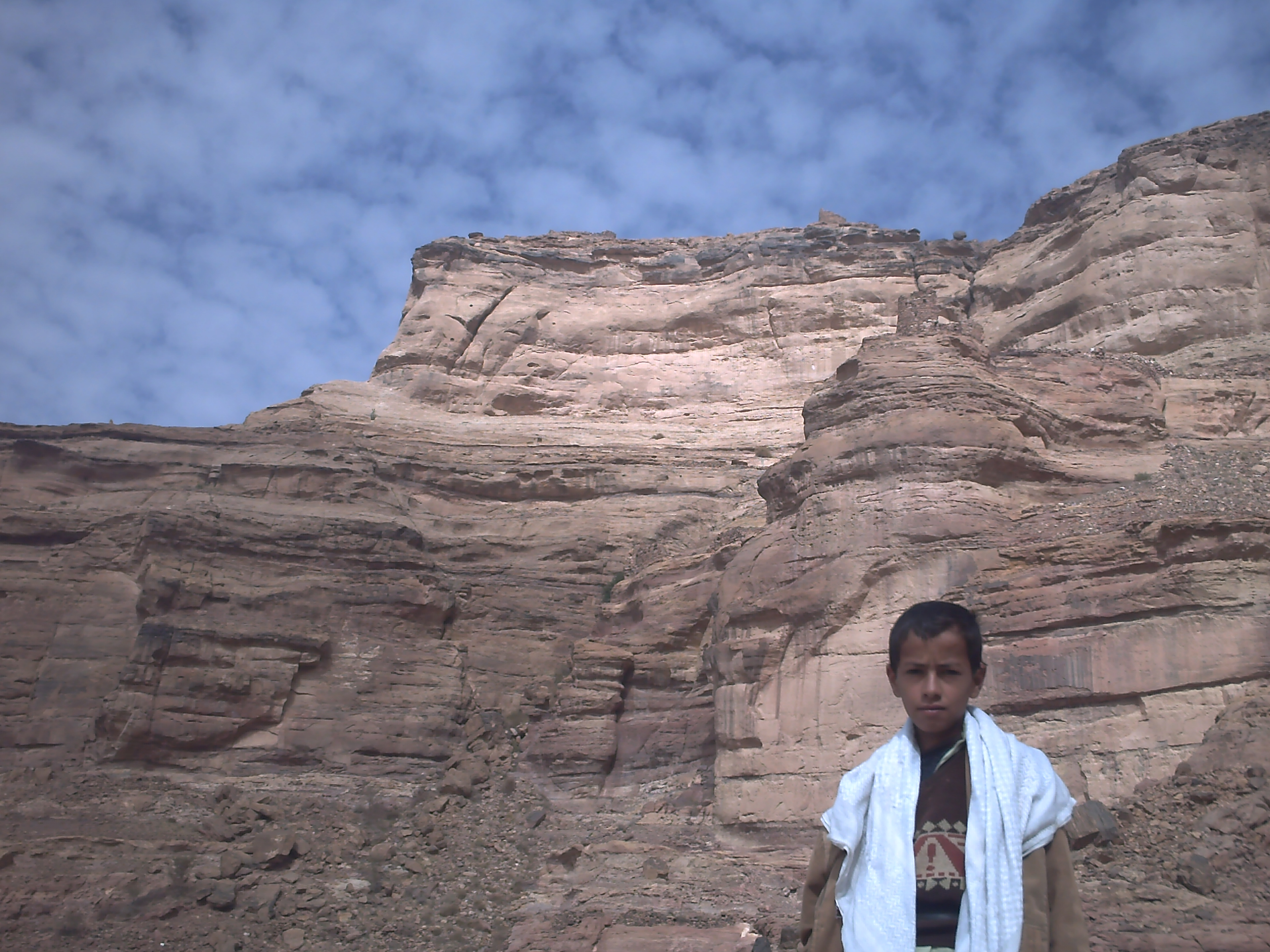
Zimarmar fort on the hill top

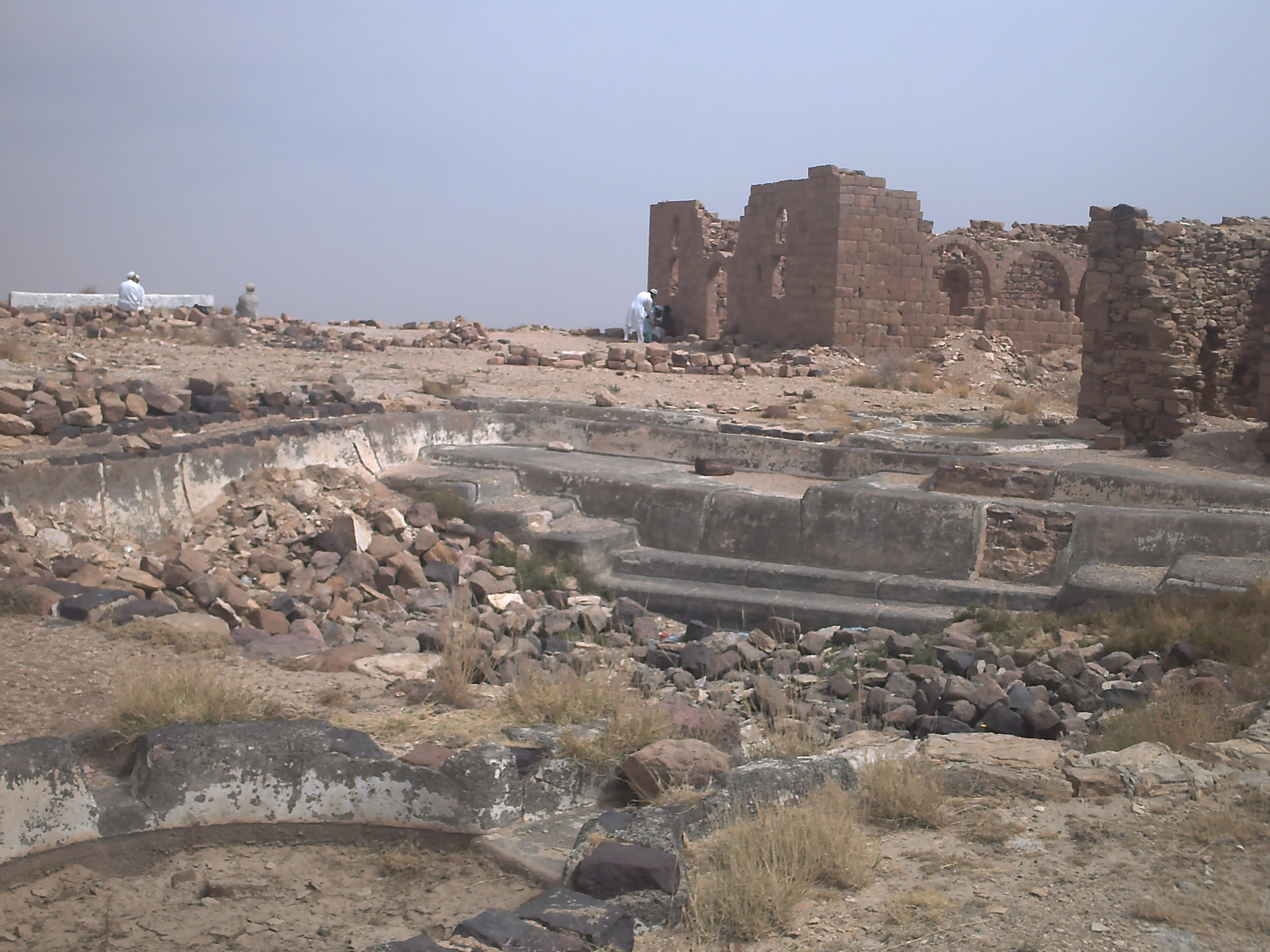
Garave mosque, pond etc. on hill top

== Sources and external links ==
- The Ismaili, their history and doctrine by Farhad Daftary (Chapter -Mustalian Ismailism- p. 300-310)
- The Uyun al-akhbar is the most complete text written by an Ismaili/Tayyibi/Dawoodi 19th Dai Sayyedna Idris bin Hasan on the history of the Ismaili community from its origins up to the 12th century CE period of the Fatimid caliphs al-Mustansir (d. 487/1094), the time of Musta‘lian rulers including al-Musta‘li (d. 495/1101) and al-Amir (d. 524/1130), and then the Tayyibi Ismaili community in Yemen.

Shia Islam titles
Abdallah Fakhr al-Din Dā'ī al-Mutlaq Died: 1407 CE Zimarmar Fort, Yemen
Preceded by Abbas ibn Muhammad	16th Dā'ī al-Mutlaq : 1377–1407 CE	Succeeded by al-Hasan Badr al-Din I
