= Ali Shams al-Din III =

Da'i al-Mutlaq of Tayyibi Isma'ilis in 1527

Syedna Ali Shamsuddin 22nd Da'i al-Mutlaq of the Dawoodi Bohra
- علي شمس الدّين

Da'i al-Mutlaq
- In office 10th Shawwal 933 AH (1527 CE) – 21st Zilqad 933 AH (1527 CE)
- Preceded by: al-Husayn Husam al-Din
- Succeeded by: Muhammad Izz al-Din I
- Title: Syedna; Maulana; Da'i al-Mutlaq; Da'i al-Fatemi
- Died: 21 Zilqad 933 AH (1527 CE)
- Resting place: Masar, Yemen
- Parent: al-Husayn Husam al-Din (father)

Religious life
- Religion: Islam
- Sect: Isma'ili; Dawoodi Bohra
- Jurisprudence: Mustaali; Tayyabi

Ali Shams al-Din ibn al-Husayn Husam al-Din (Arabic: علي شمس الدين بن الحسين حسام الدين, romanized: ʿAlī Shams al-Dīn ibn al-Ḥusayn Ḥusām al-Dīn; died 1527) was the 22nd Da'i al-Mutlaq of Tayyibi Isma'ilis in 1527.

== Life ==
His incumbency was among the shortest of all Da'is, lasting more than a month. He was the successor to the 21st Da'i al-Husayn Husam al-Din to the religious post.

== Sources ==
- Daftary, Farhad (2007). The Ismāʿı̄lı̄s: Their History and Doctrines (Second ed.). Cambridge: Cambridge University Press. ISBN 978-0-521-61636-2.
- Lathan, Young, Religion, Learning and Science
- Bacharach, Joseph W. Meri, Medieval Islamic Civilisation

Shia Islam titles
Ali Shams al-Din III Dā'ī al-Mutlaq Died: 21 Zilqad 933 AH /1527 AD), Zabeed, Yemen
Preceded by al-Husayn Husam al-Din	22nd Dā'ī al-Mutlaq : 933AH/ 1527AD	Succeeded by Muhammad Izz al-Din I
