= Muhammad ibn Hatim =

Muhammad ibn Hatim (Arabic: محمد بن حاتم, romanized: Muḥammad ibn Ḥātim) was the twelfth Tayyibi Isma'ili dāʿī al-muṭlaq in Yemen, in 1328–29.

Muhammad ibn Hatim tenure was one of the shortest among the Yemeni dāʿīs.

He succeeded Ibrahim ibn al-Husayn, and was in turn succeeded by Ibrahim's son, Ali Shams al-Din I.

== Family ==
He was the grandson of the eighth dāʿī, al-Husayn ibn Ali. He had three sons, Ali, Abd al-Muttalib and Abbas.

== Tomb ==
His grave, along with those of the 11th and 13th dāʿīs, were hidden and unknown until recently, when the archaeological authority of Yemen, along with Dawoodi Bohras living there, located them on Hisn Af'ida. On 25 November 2018, Mufaddal Saifuddin, the 53rd dāʿī al-muṭlaq, unveiled its existence.

== Gallery ==
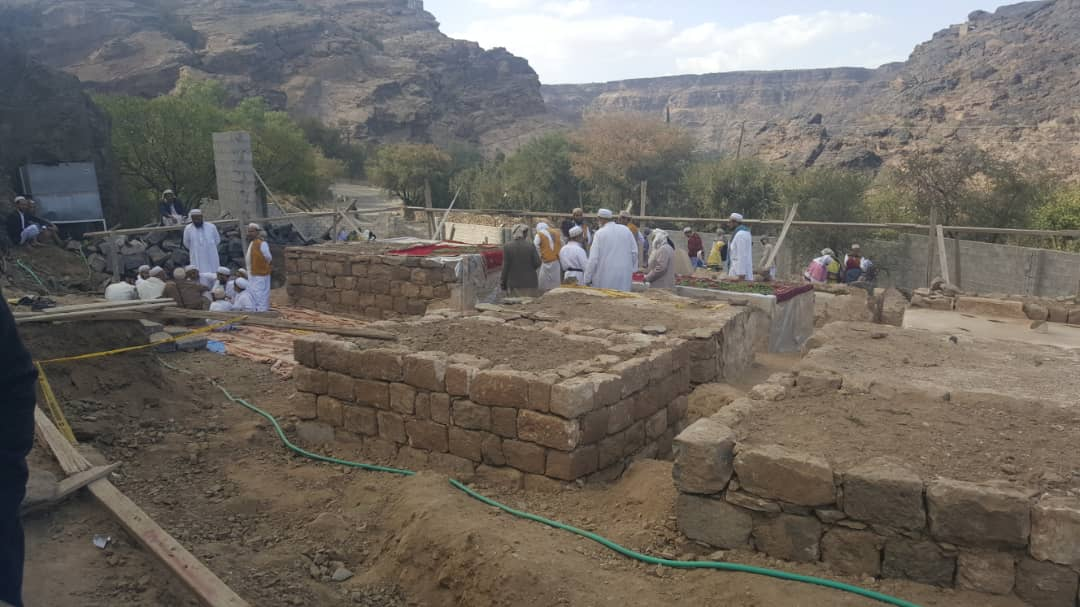
Graves of the three Dāʿīs being uncovered at Hisn Af'ida

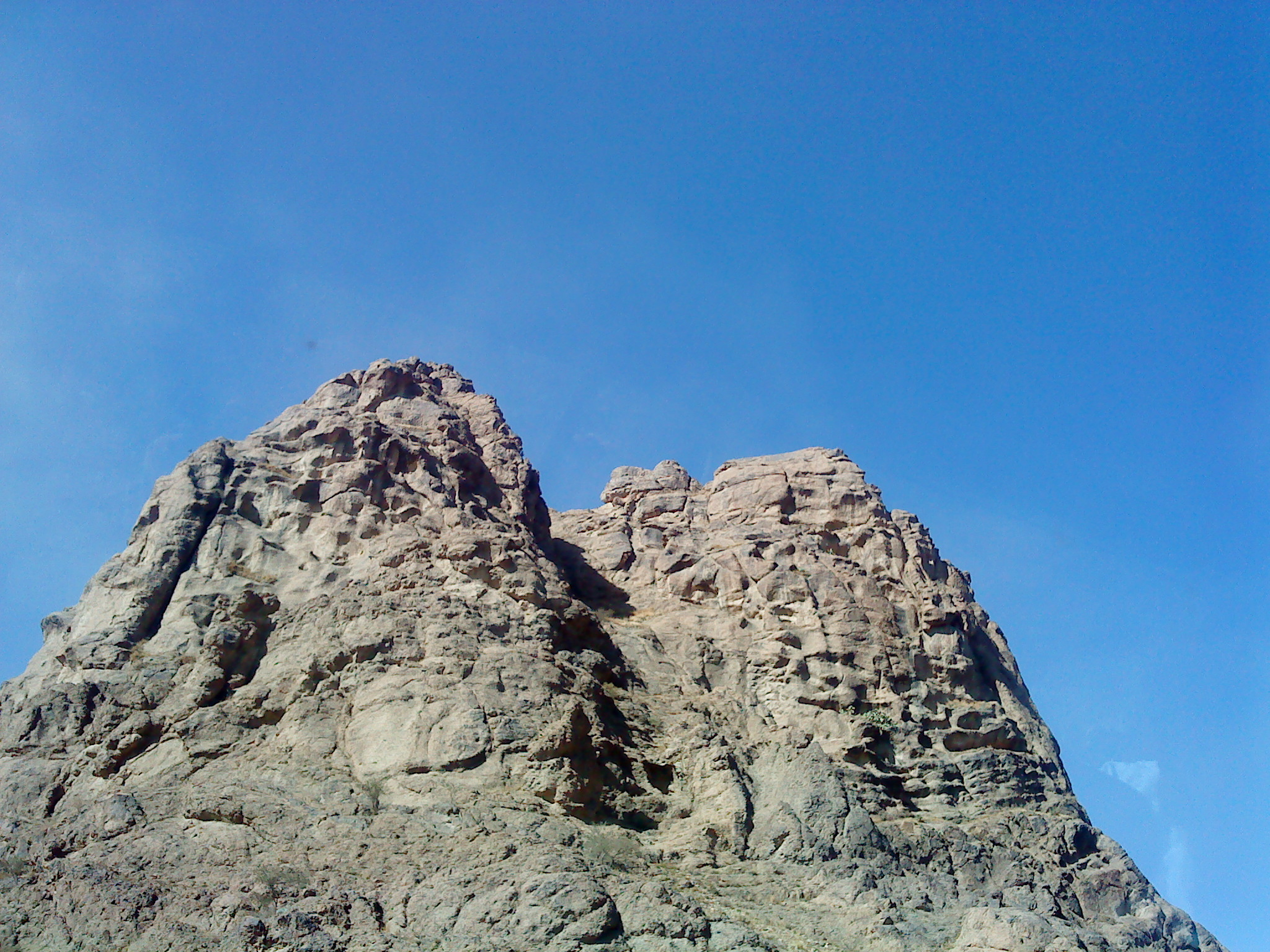
Hisn Af'ida hill, near al-Maḩārīq, Sanaa, where the graves of the 11th, 12th, 13th and 15th dāʿīs are located

== Sources ==
- Daftary, Farhad (2007). The Ismāʿı̄lı̄s: Their History and Doctrines (Second ed.). Cambridge: Cambridge University Press. ISBN 978-0-521-61636-2.

Shia Islam titles
Muhammad ibn Hatim Dā'ī al-Mutlaq Died: 1329 CE Hisn Af'ida hill, near al-Maḩārīq, Sanaa
Preceded by Ibrahim ibn al-Husayn	12th Dā'ī al-Mutlaq : 1328–1329 CE	Succeeded by Ali Shams al-Din I
