= Bedrettin =

Bedrettin is a Turkish given name derived from the Arabic name Badr al-Din. Notable people with the name include:

- Bedrettin Dalan (born 1941), Turkish engineer and politician
- Bedrettin Tuncel (1910–1980), Turkish academic and politician
- Bedrettin Yıldızeli (born 1970), Turkish physician
