= Abd al-Muttalib (Ibn al-Walid) =

Abd al-Muttalib ibn Muhammad (Arabic: عبد المطلب بن محمد, romanized: ʿAbd al-Muṭṭalib ibn Muḥammad) was the fourteenth Tayyibi Isma'ili Dāʿī al-Muṭlaq in Yemen, from 1345 to his death in 1354. He followed Ali Shams al-Din I, and was himself succeeded by Abbas ibn Muhammad.

== Family ==
Syedna Abd al-Muttalib was the son of 12th Dai Muhammad ibn Hatim. His brother was the 15th Dai Abbas ibn Muhammad.

== Life ==
Syedna Abd al-Muttalib entrusted his brother Syedna Abbas with promoting education.

Shareef Ibrahim bin Abdullah, ruler of Sanaa sought to capture territories under the jurisdiction of Syedna Abd al-Muttalib but backed out. Henceforth relations remained cordial.

== Death ==
He died on 24 Rajab, 755 AH (August 8, 1354 AD). The grave of the Dāʿī along with those of the 16th and 17th Dāʿīs are at the hilltop Zimarmar Fort. The small square is grave of their maʾdhūn (senior deputy) Ahmad ibn Ali ibn Hanzala. On the hill top there still exist remains of a mosque, buildings and water reservoirs.

== Gallery ==
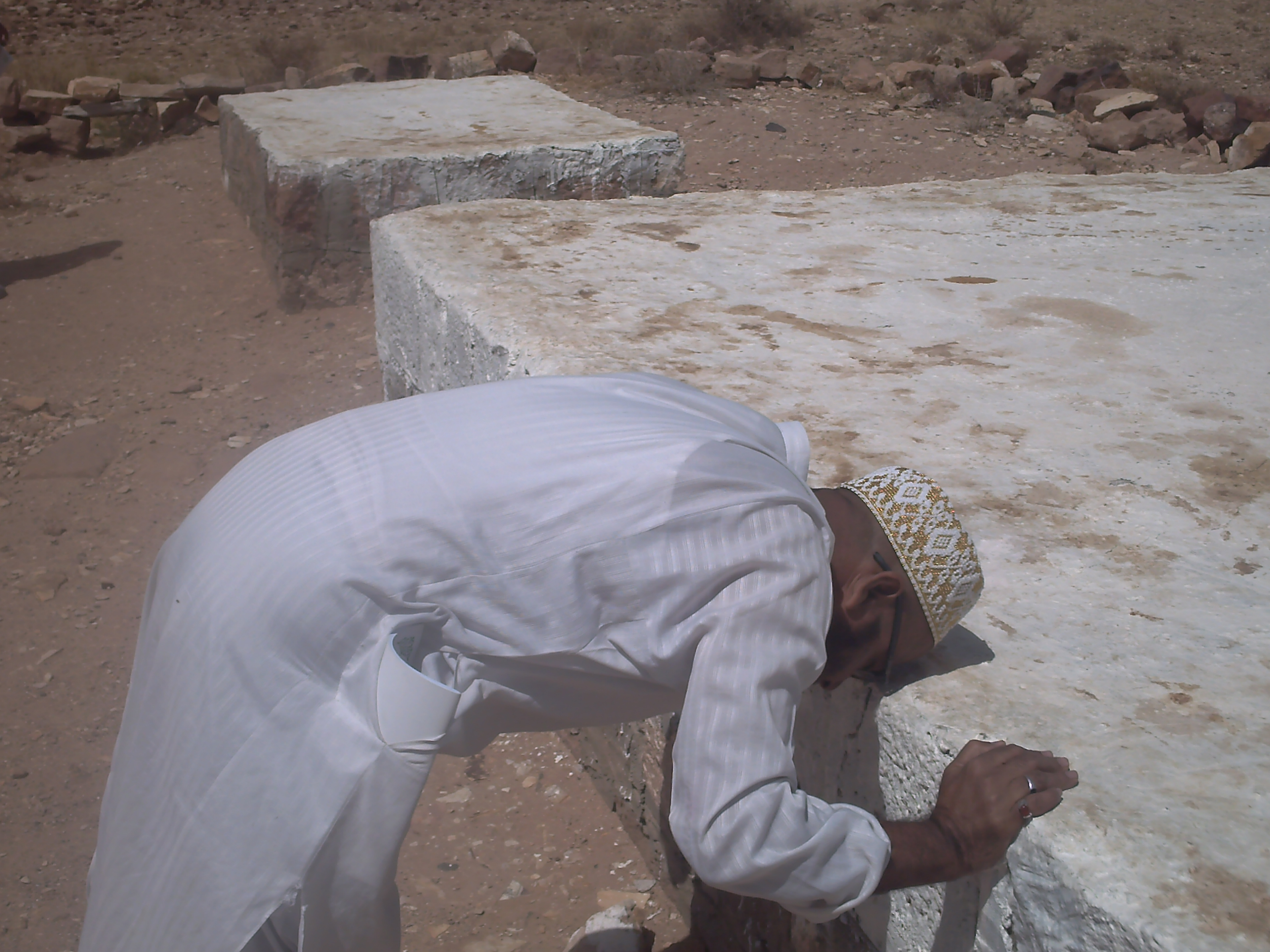
Grave of the 14th, 16th and 17th dai (the bigger one) Zimarmar fort, Yemen

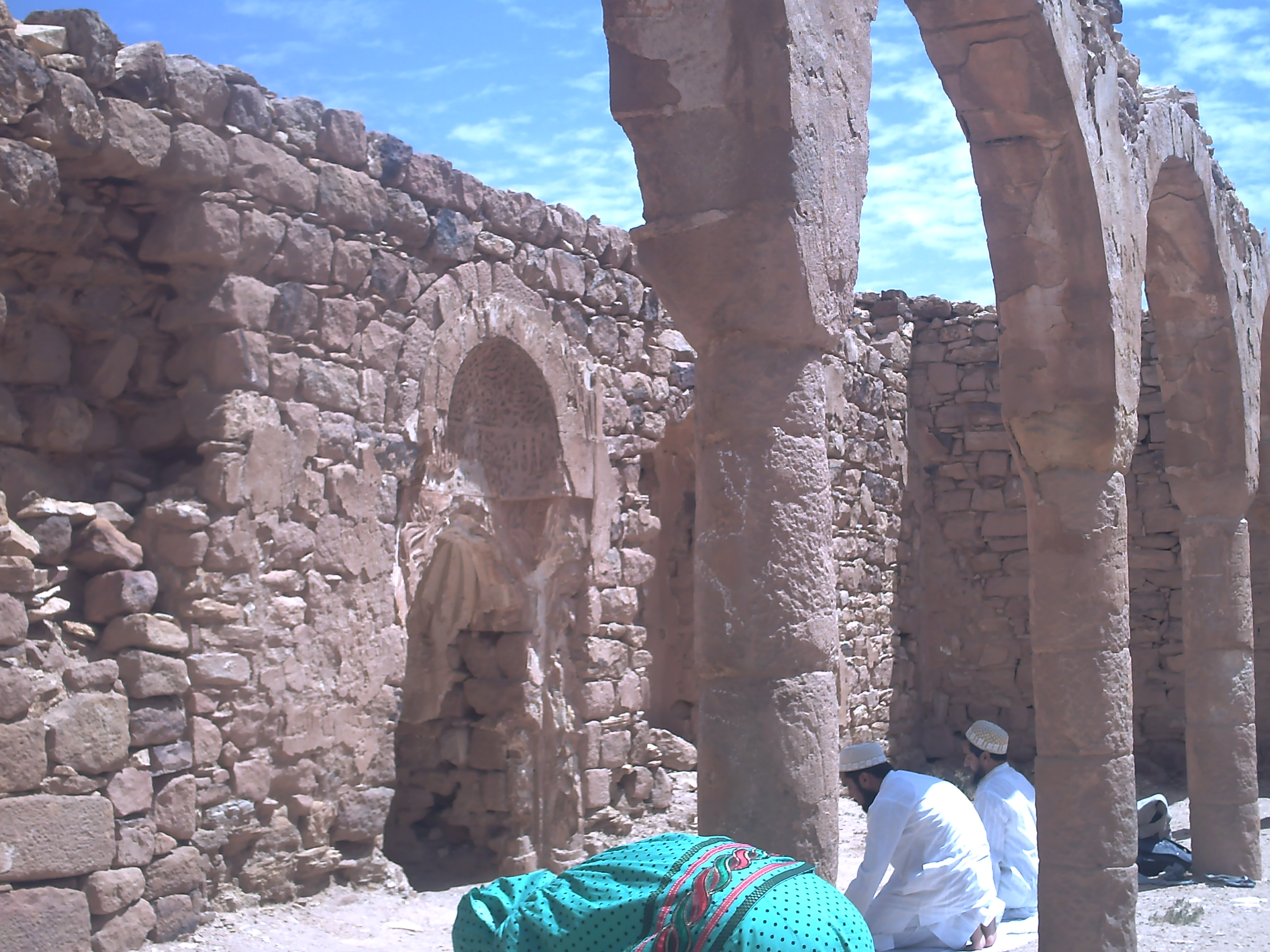
Mosque of dai at Zimarmar fort, Yemen

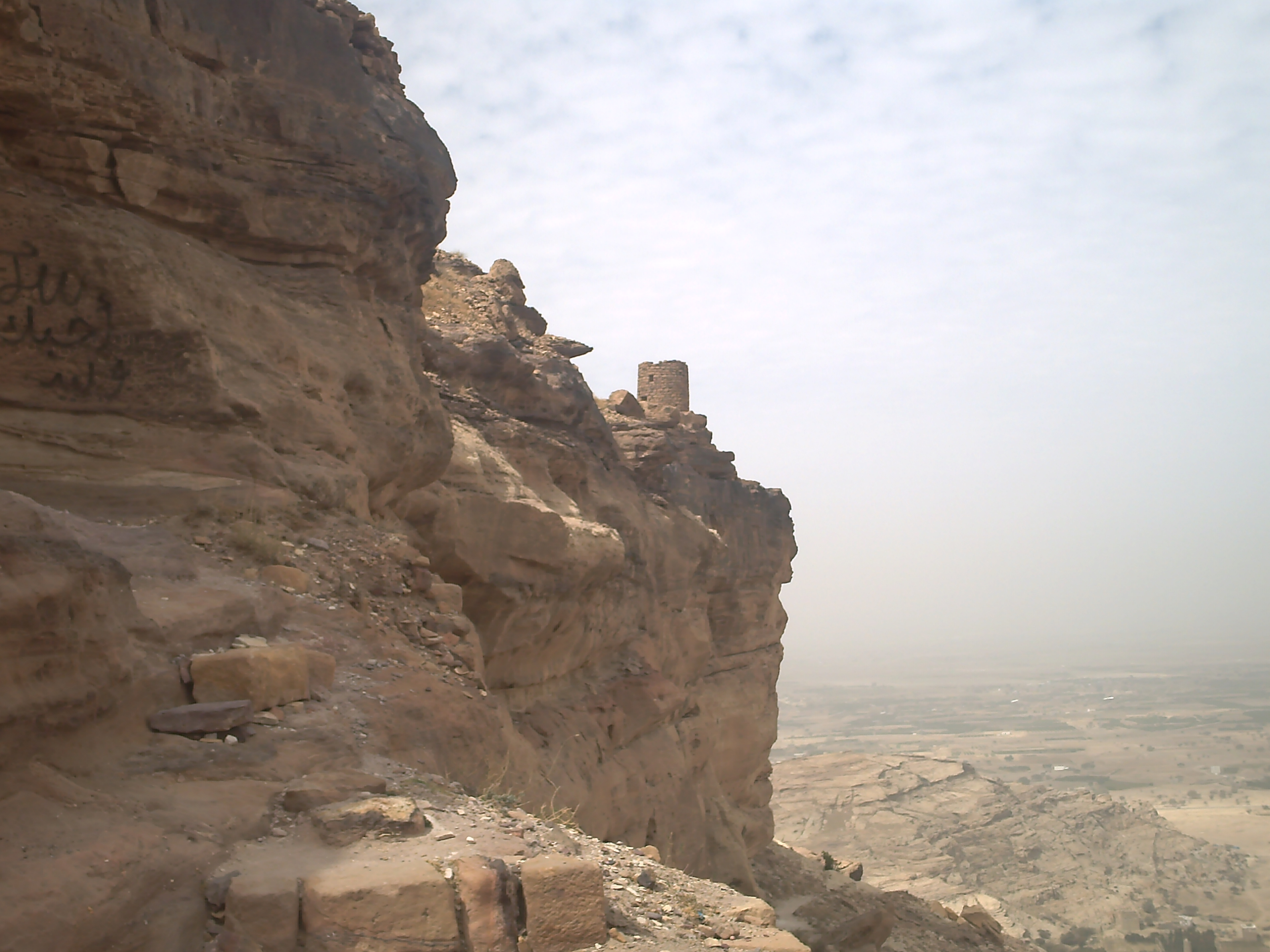
Zimarmar fort on hill top

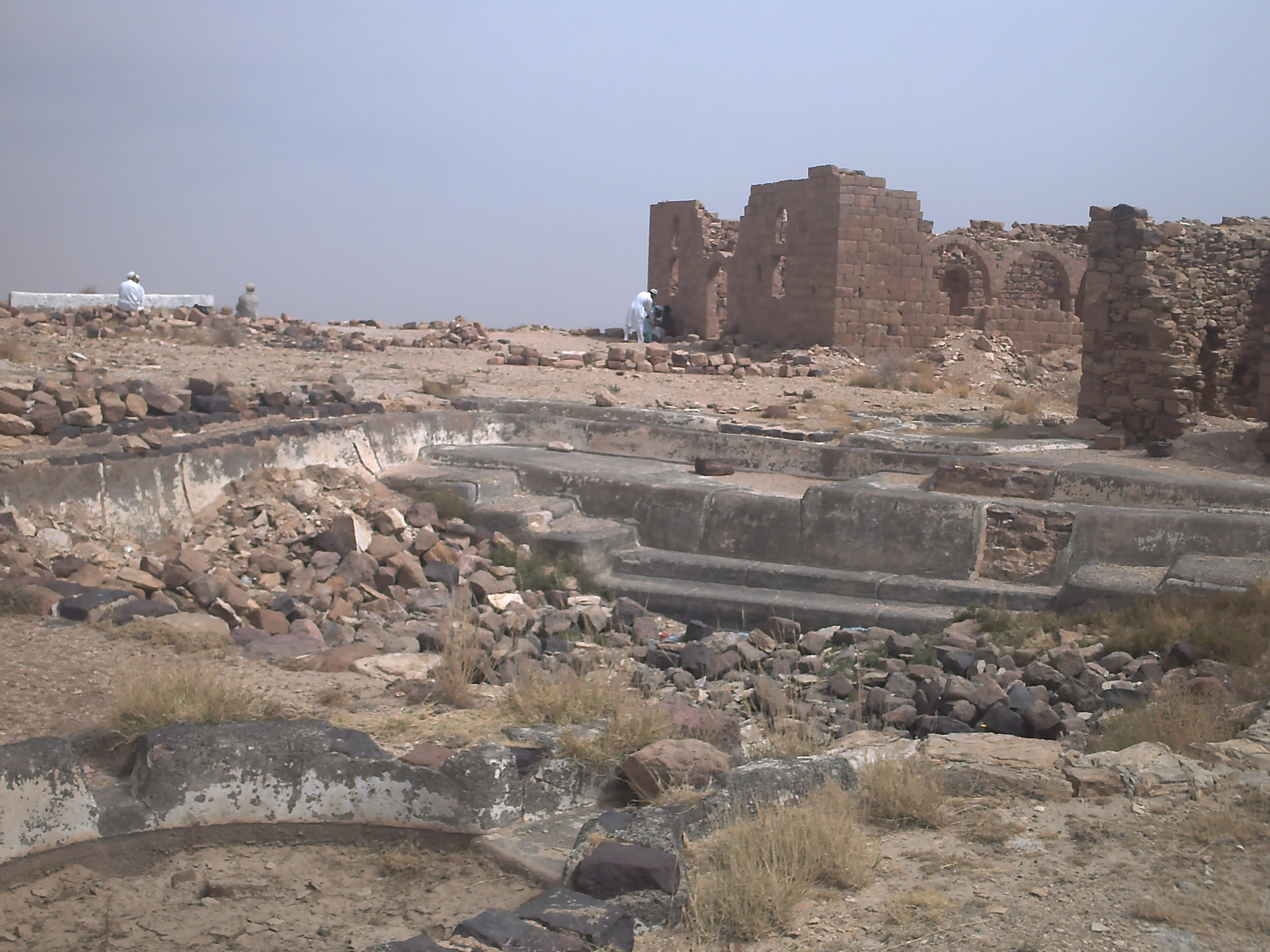
Garave mosque, pond etc. on hill top

== Sources ==
- Daftary, Farhad (2007). The Ismāʿı̄lı̄s: Their History and Doctrines (Second ed.). Cambridge: Cambridge University Press. ISBN 978-0-521-61636-2.

Shia Islam titles
Abd al-Muttalib (Ibn al-Walid) Dā'ī al-Mutlaq Died: 1354 CE Zimarmar Fort, Yemen
Preceded by Ali Shams al-Din I	14th Dā'ī al-Mutlaq : 1345–1354 CE	Succeeded by Abbas ibn Muhammad
