= Al-Hasan Badr al-Din II =

Da'i al-Mutlaq of Tayyibi Isma'ilis from 1468 to 1512

Al-Hasan Badr al-Din ibn Idris (Arabic: الحسن بدرالدين بن إدريس, romanized: al-Ḥasan Badr al-Dīn ibn Idrīs) was the 20th Da'i al-Mutlaq of Tayyibi Isma'ilis in Yemen from 1468 to 1512.

== Life ==
He succeeded his father Idris Imad al-Din in 1468, and held the post until his death in 1512, when he was succeeded by his brother al-Husayn Husam al-Din. Al-Hasan encouraged education and bestowed great favors on his students. He used to shower special attention on anyone who came from India.

His son, Muhammad Izz al-Din I, would succeed as the 23rd Da'i al-Mutlaq in 1527, the last from the Banu al-Walid al-Anf family that had dominated the office since the early 13th century.

== Sources ==
- Daftary, Farhad (2007). The Ismāʿı̄lı̄s: Their History and Doctrines (Second ed.). Cambridge: Cambridge University Press. ISBN 978-0-521-61636-2.
- Qutbuddin, Tahera (2018). "Idrīs ʿImād al-Dīn". In Fleet, Kate; Krämer, Gudrun; Matringe, Denis; Nawas, John; Rowson, Everett (eds.). Encyclopaedia of Islam (3rd ed.). Brill Online. doi:10.1163/1573-3912_ei3_COM_32368. ISSN 1873-9830.

Shia Islam titles
Al-Hasan Badr al-Din II Dā'ī al-Mutlaq Died: 1512 CE, Masar, Yemen
Preceded by Idris Imad al-Din	20th Dā'ī al-Mutlaq : 1468–1512 CE	Succeeded by al-Husayn Husam al-Din
