= Badreddine Missaoui =

Tunisian politician

Badreddine Missaoui (Arabic: بدر الدين مسوي) was a member of the Pan-African Parliament from Tunisia.
