= Al-Husayn Husam al-Din =

Da'i al-Mutlaq of Tayyibi Isma'ilis from 1512 to 1527

Al-Husayn Husam al-Din ibn Idris Imad al-Din (Arabic: الحسين حسام الدين بن إدريس عماد الدين, romanized: al-Ḥusayn Ḥusām al-Dīn ibn Idrīs ʿImād al-Dīn) was the 21st Da'i al-Mutlaq of Tayyibi Isma'ilis in Yemen from 1512 to 1527.

== Life ==
He succeeded his brother al-Hasan Badr al-Din II in 1512, and held the post until his death in 1527, when he was succeeded by his son Ali Shams al-Din III.

== Sources ==
- Daftary, Farhad (2007). The Ismāʿı̄lı̄s: Their History and Doctrines (Second ed.). Cambridge: Cambridge University Press. ISBN 978-0-521-61636-2.
- Qutbuddin, Tahera (2018). "Idrīs ʿImād al-Dīn". In Fleet, Kate; Krämer, Gudrun; Matringe, Denis; Nawas, John; Rowson, Everett (eds.). Encyclopaedia of Islam (3rd ed.). Brill Online. doi:10.1163/1573-3912_ei3_COM_32368. ISSN 1873-9830.

Shia Islam titles
Al-Husayn Husam al-Din Dā'ī al-Mutlaq Died: 21 Zilqad 933 AH /1527 AD), Zabeed, Yemen
Preceded by al-Hasan Badr al-Din II	21st Dā'ī al-Mutlaq : 1512–1527 CE	Succeeded by Ali Shams al-Din III
