= Al-Hasan Badr al-Din I =

Within the history of Yemen, Al-Hasan Badr al-Din ibn Abdallah (Arabic: الحسن بدرالدين بن عبدالله, romanized: al-Ḥasan Badr al-Dīn ibn ʿAbdallāh) was the 17th Tayyibi Isma'ili Dāʿī al-Muṭlaq in Yemen. He succeeded his father Abdallah Fakhr al-Din in 1407, and held the post until his death in 1418, when he was succeeded by his brother Ali Shams al-Din II.

== Life ==
Al-Hasan Badr al-Din became Da'i al-Mutlaq in 809AH /1345AD. His period of Dawat was from 809-821AH (1406-1418 AD) for about 12 years (Hijri), 27 days.

His Mawazeen: Syedi Abdul Muttalib Najmuddin, Al Maula Mohammad bin Idris, Mukasir: Syedi Ahmad bin Syedna Abdullah (his younger brother)

== Death ==
The grave of the Dāʿī along with those of the 14th and 16th Dāʿīs are at Zimarmar Fort in Yemen, on the top of the hill. The small square is grave of their associates (mazoon). On the hill top there still exist remains of Mosque of Sultan Ali Bin Hatim, buildings and water reservoirs. Syedna Al-Hasan janaza prayers were led by his son Syedna Idris Imad al-Din.

== Succession ==
He was succeeded by the 18th Dai Syedna Ali Shams al-Din II son of the 16th Dai Syedna Abdallah Fakhr al-Din. His son succeeded the 18th Dai as the 19th Dai Syedna Idris Imad al-Din.

== Gallery ==
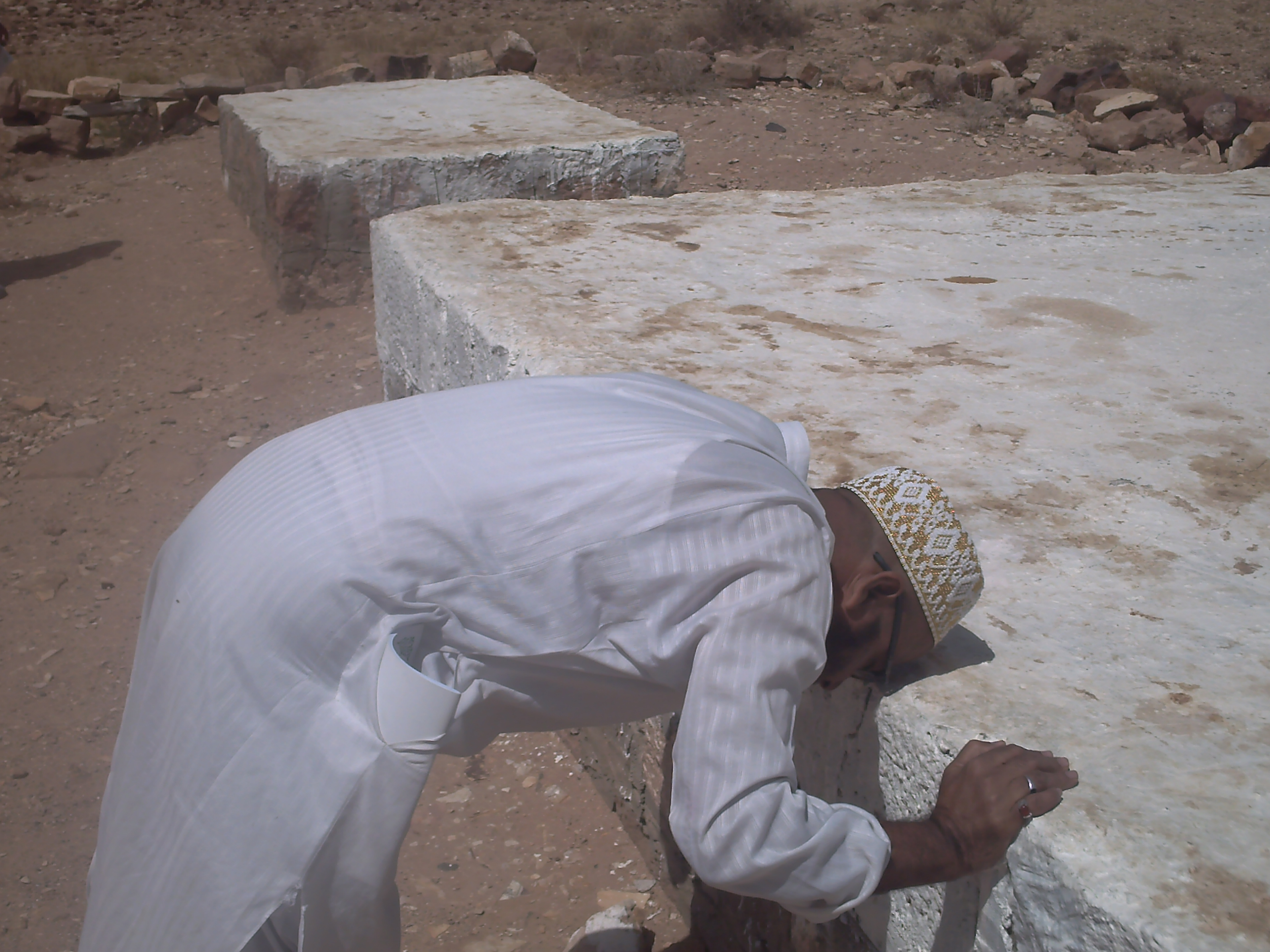
The tombs of the 14th, 16th and 17th Dāʿīs (in the foreground), Zimarmar Fort, Yemen

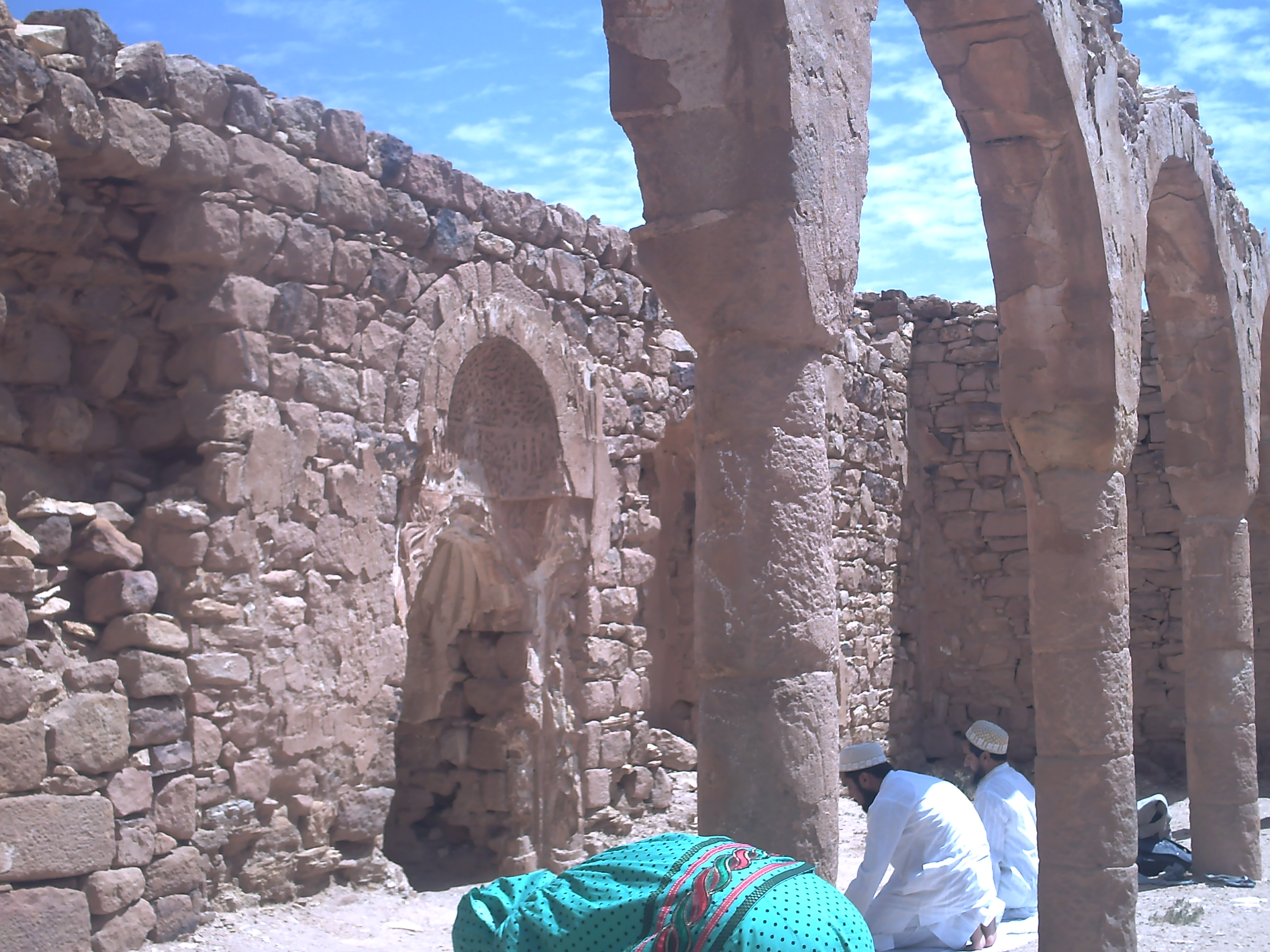
Masjid-e-Aqdam, Mosque of the Dāʿī at Zimarmar Fort

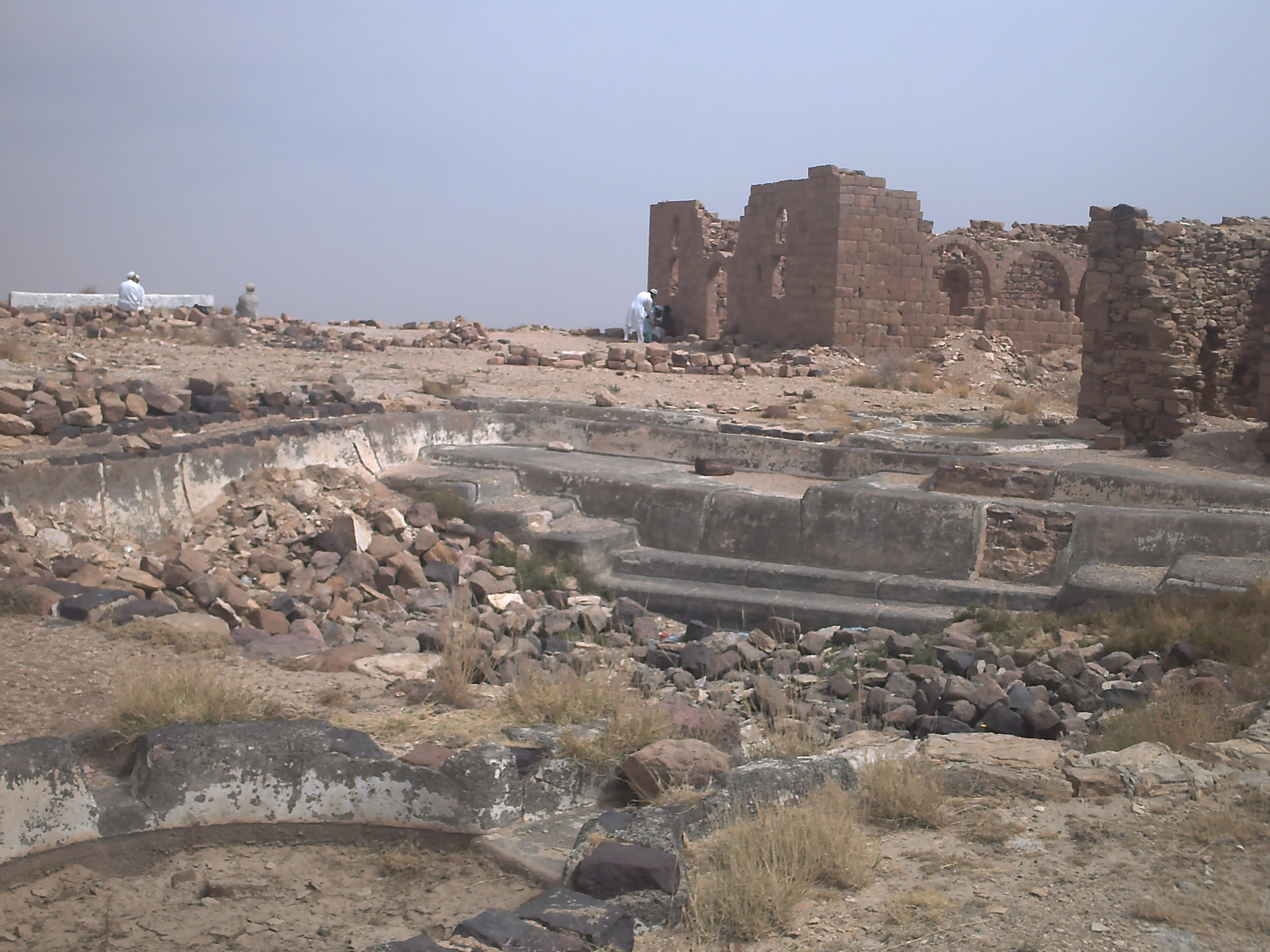
Ruins of the grave mosque, pond etc. on hill top

== Sources ==
- Daftary, Farhad (2007). The Ismāʿı̄lı̄s: Their History and Doctrines (Second ed.). Cambridge: Cambridge University Press. ISBN 978-0-521-61636-2.
- Qutbuddin, Tahera (2018). "Idrīs ʿImād al-Dīn". In Fleet, Kate; Krämer, Gudrun; Matringe, Denis; Nawas, John; Rowson, Everett (eds.). Encyclopaedia of Islam (3rd ed.). Brill Online. doi:10.1163/1573-3912_ei3_COM_32368. ISSN 1873-9830.

Shia Islam titles
Al-Hasan Badr al-Din I Dā'ī al-Mutlaq Died: 1418 CE Zimarmar Fort, Yemen
Preceded by Abdallah Fakhr al-Din	17th Dā'ī al-Mutlaq : 1407–1418 CE	Succeeded by Ali Shams al-Din II
