= Muhammad Izz al-Din I =

Syedna Mohammed Ezzuddin 23rd Da'i al-Mutlaq of the Dawoodi Bohra
- محمد عِزّالدين
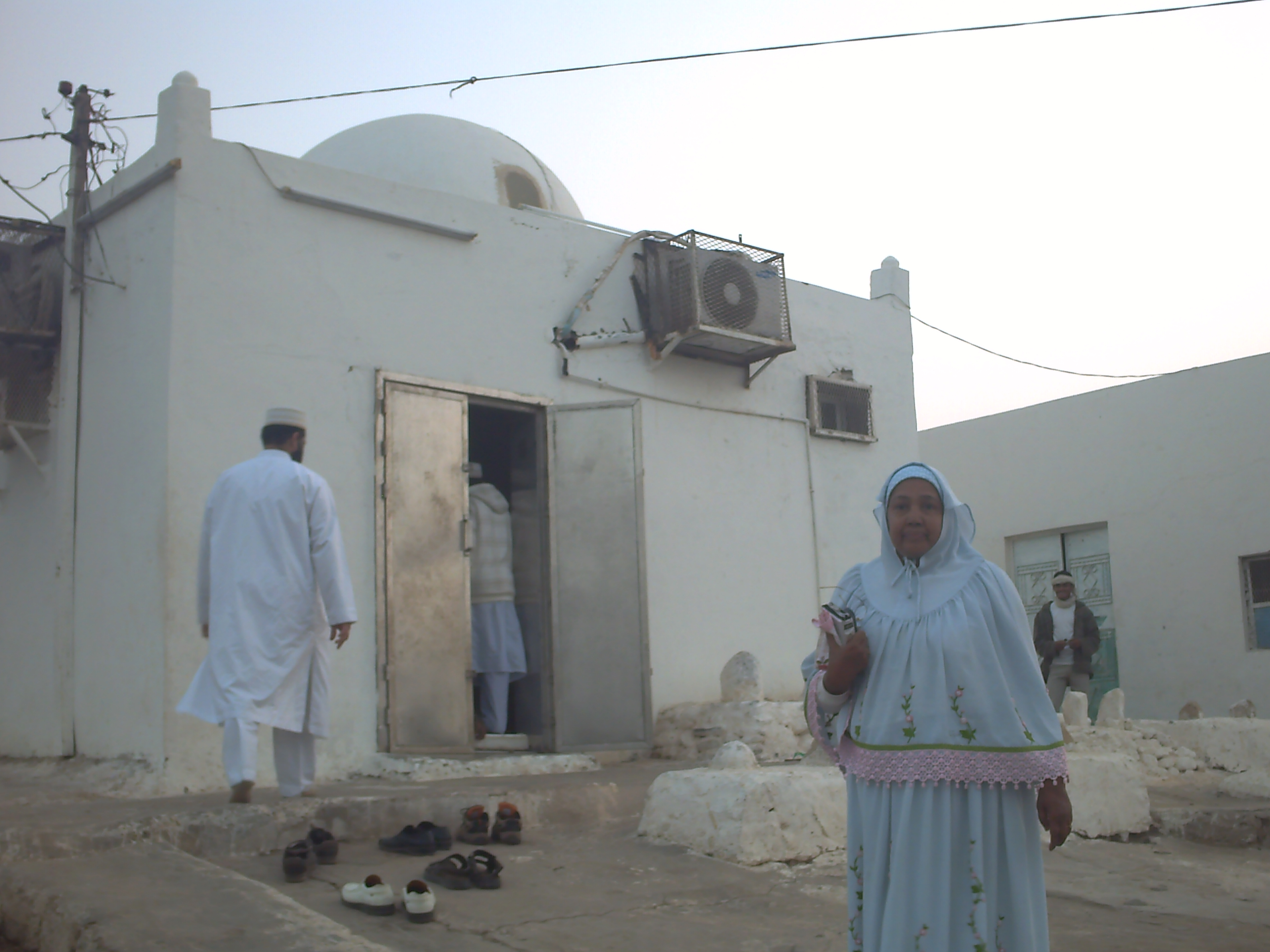
- The mausoleum of Syedna Mohammed in Zabid, Yemen

Da'i al-Mutlaq
- In office 1527 CE (933 AH) – 1539 CE (946 AH)
- Preceded by: Ali Shams al-Din III
- Succeeded by: Yusuf Najmuddin ibn Sulaiman
- Title: Syedna; Maulana; Da'i al-Mutlaq; Da'i al-Fatemi
- Died: 27th Safar al-Muzaffar, 946 AH (1539 CE)
- Resting place: Zabid, Yemen

Religious life
- Religion: Islam
- Sect: Isma'ili; Dawoodi Bohra
- Jurisprudence: Mustaali; Tayyabi

Syedna Mohammad Ezzuddin (Arabic: محمد عزالدين, romanized: Muḥammad ʿIzz al-Dīn) (died 1539 / 27th Safar, 946 AH in Zabid, Yemen) was the 23rd Da'i of the Dawoodi Bohra, a sub-sect of Isma'ili Shi'i Islam. The Dawoodi Bohra trace their belief system back to Yemen, where it evolved from the Fatimid Caliphate and where they were persecuted due to their differences from mainstream Sunni Islam and Zaydi Islam. Around 1567 CE, the Da'wat (the sect's religious organisation) was relocated to Gujarat, India.

== Life ==
He succeeded the 22nd Dai, Syedna Ali Shamshuddin, and conferred succession on Syedna Yusuf Najmuddin. Syedna Mohammed was the 17th Da'i from Ale Waleed and the last of Du'āt Mutlaqūn from Yemen. He resided in Masar but had to leave due to the immense atrocities of the Zaidi Imam Al-Mutawakkil Yahya Sharaf ad-Din. He had to submit the fortress of Masar to the Zaidi Imam after the wafāt or demise of Syedi Hasan bin Nuh.

== Death ==
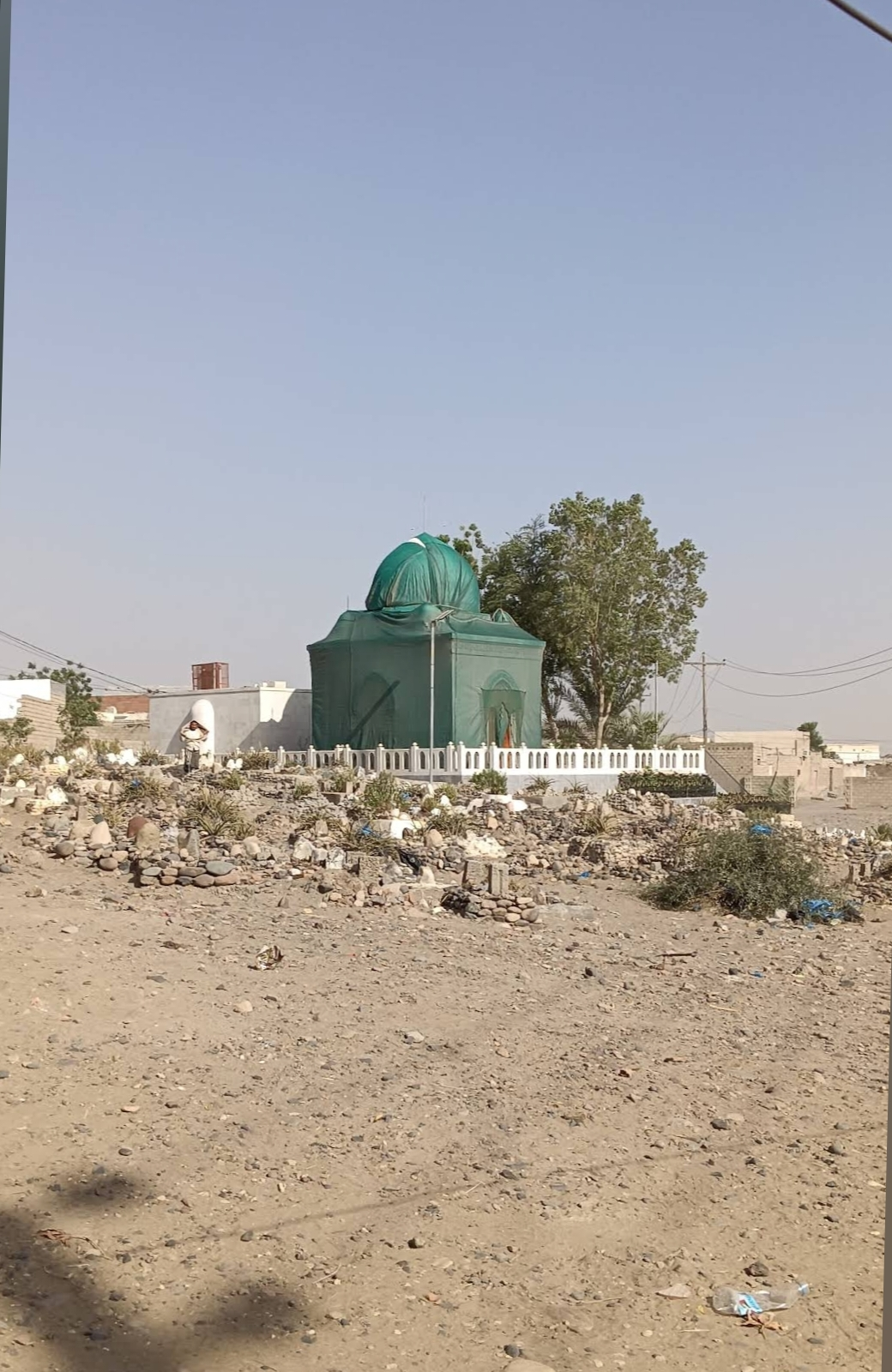
New tomb under construction in Zabid by the Dawoodi Bohra Community.

Syedna Ezzuddin arrived in Zabid with the intention of going to Hajj but the Zaidi followers had poisoned the drinking water in the ship and it had affected Syedna. On knowing this he returned to Zabid immediately and died after a few days.

== Succession ==
Syedna Muhammad Ezzuddin conferred nass or succession upon Syedna Yusuf Najmuddin. He prepared three letters, one of which was kept in Yemen and the other two sent to Hind in different ships. When Ezzuddin sent the nass letters to Hind, he was told that he might not be aware of the situation in Hind as well as that of Syedna Najmuddin due to the long distance. Syedna Mohammed Ezzuddin replied that “The letter will reach Yusuf Najmuddin and he shall become Da'i al-Mutlaq”, and it did happen.

Shia Islam titles
Muhammad Izz al-Din I Dā'ī al-Mutlaq Died: 1539 / 27th Safar, AH 946AH in Zabid -Yemen
Preceded by Ali Shams al-Din III	23rd Dā'ī al-Mutlaq : 933–946 AH/ 1527–1539 AD	Succeeded by Yusuf Najmuddin ibn Sulaiman
