= Abbas ibn Muhammad =

Abbas ibn Muhammad (Arabic: عباس بن محمد, romanized: ʿAbbās ibn Muḥammad) was the 15th Da'i al-Mutlaq of Tayyibi (died on 8 Shawwal al-Mukarram 779 AH/6 February 1378 AD, Hisne Af’ida, next to Al Maḩārīq, Sanaa, Hamdan, Yemen). He succeeded the 14th Dai Syedna Abdul Muttalib to the religious post and was the 10th Dai from the lineage of al-Waleed.

== Life ==
Abbas ibn Muhammad became Da'i al-Mutlaq in 746 AH/1354 AD. His period of Dawat was from 746 to 779 AH/1354–1377 AD for about twenty-three years.

Syedna Abbas greatly stressed on obligatory prayers, those who showed laxity or negligence were deprived of his audience. He also ordered that no one be allowed to study Ta'awil until they were well versed in Zahir (Islam) of Sharia.

He entrusted Syedna Abdallah Fakhr al-Din to administer the territory of Haraaz.

Shia Islam titles
Abbas ibn Muhammad Dā'ī al-Mutlaq Died: 1377 CE Hisne Af’ida, next to Al Maḩārīq, Sanaa
Preceded by Abd al-Muttalib	15th Dā'ī al-Mutlaq : 1354–1377 CE	Succeeded by Abdallah Fakhr al-Din
