= Badr al-Dīn ibn Jamaʿah =

Shafi'i jurist (1241–1333)

Personal details
- Born: 1241 Cairo, Egypt
- Died: 1333 (aged 91–92)
- Occupation: Jurist
- Known for: Chief Justice of Cairo and Damascus

Badr al-Dīn Abu Abd Allah Muhammad ibn Jamaʿah (1241–1333) was a Shafi'i jurist of Mamluk Sultanate (now Egypt) and a member of the Banu Jumah clan. He served as chief justice under the Mamluks of Cairo and twice in Damascus during a period when Shafi'i jurisprudence was favored by the state.

Badr al-Dīn was one of the teachers of the Damascene-based ḥadīth scholar Al-Dhahabi.

== Political theory ==
Like many other jurists Badr al-Dīn emphasized obedience to rulers, contending "the ruler is a necessity without whom there can be no justice for he is the shadow of God on earth". If that ruler is overthrown, the new ruler must be obeyed, for "we are with whoever conquers", even if he is "barbarous or vicious", otherwise the Islamic community may become divided and weakened. His point of view reflected desperation of an "honest and pious observer" over the unrest of the time according to one historian (Bernard Lewis), and his subservience to the ruling Mamluk sultans according to another (Jebran Chamieh).

== Major works ==
Among his many works, some are:

- 'Idah al-Dalil fi Qat'i Hujaj Ahl al-Ta'til (Explanation of Evidence in Cutting the Argument of the People of the Rejecters/Deniers of Allah's Names and Attributes).
- Ghurar al-Tibyān fī man lam yusamma fī al-Qurʼān.
- Etiquette of the Learner: An Abridgement of Tadhkirat al-Sāmiʻ wa-al-Mutakallim fī Adab al-ʻālim wa-al-Mutaʻallim.

== See also ==
- List of Ash'aris

== Bibliography ==
- Rosenthal, Erwin I. J. (1958). Political Thought in Medieval Islam: An Introductory Outline. Cambridge University Press. ISBN 9780511735332.
- Ibn Jamāʿah, Badr al-Dīn (1988). Fuʾād ʿAbd al-Munʿim Aḥmad (ed.). Taḥrīr al-aḥkām fī tadbīr ahl al-Islām (3rd ed.). Doha, Qatar: Dār al-Thaqāfa, Riʾāsah al-Maḥākim al-Sharʿīyah.
- Lambton, Ann K. S. (1981). State and Government in Medieval Islam: An Introduction to the Study of Islamic Political Theory. Oxford: Oxford University Press.
- Salibi, Kamal S. (1958). "The Banū Jamāʿa: A Dynasty of Shāfi'ite Jurists in the Mamluk Period". Studia Islamica (9). Brill: 97–109. doi:10.2307/1594977. JSTOR 1594977.
