= Badrudduja =

Badrudduja, Badaruddoza, Badruddoza, or Bodruddoza (Bengali: বদরুদ্দোজা, lit. 'Full Moon of the Night') is a masculine given name and surname of Bengali origin. Notable people with the name include:

== Given name ==
=== Badaruddoza ===
- Badaruddoza Khan (born 1954), Indian politician

=== Badruddoza ===
- Badruddoza Ahmed Shuja, Bangladeshi politician

=== Bodruddoza ===
- Bodruddoza Md. Farhad Hossain (born 1971), Bangladeshi politician

== Surname ==
=== Badruddoza ===
- Kazi M. Badruddoza (1927–2023), Bangladeshi agronomist
- Mohammad Badruddoza (died 2017), Bangladeshi politician

=== Badrudduja ===
- Syed Badrudduja (1900–1974), Indian politician

== See also ==
- Badr-ud-Duja, studio album
- Badr (Arabic name)
