= Ali Shams al-Din II =

Ali Shams al-Din ibn Abdallah (Arabic: علي شمس الدين بن عبدالله, romanized: ʿAlī Shams al-Dīn ibn ʿAbdallāh) was the 18th Tayyibi Isma'ili Dāʿī al-Muṭlaq in Yemen. He succeeded his brother al-Hasan Badr al-Din I in 1418, and held the post until his death in 1428, when he was succeeded by his nephew (al-Hasan's son) Idris Imad al-Din.

== Life ==
After the death of Hasan, Ali took up residence in the fortress of Dhu Marmar. But in 1426, the Zaydi imam of Sana'a, al-Mansur Ali (r. 1391–1436), captured Dhu Marmar after a siege, but allowed the Dāʿī with his family, followers, and possessions to leave the town and move to Haraz, which became the new base of the Tayyibi movement. The Tayyibis also lost a number of other fortresses to the Zaydis at this time, which were later recovered by Idris Imad al-Din. Ali then moved to Af'eda and then to Shibaam.

It was during his tenure that there was a major split into Sunni Bohra led by Jafar bin Khwaja, a native of Patan, Gujarat in Gujarat, India. This split caused deep anxiety and mental agony to Ali. His brother, Maad Izzuddin took him to Shareqa.

== Mausoleum ==
Syedna Ali died in Shareqa, Yemen. Syedna Mohammed Burhanuddin built and completed a mausoleum of Syedna Ali in 2007.

== Gallery ==
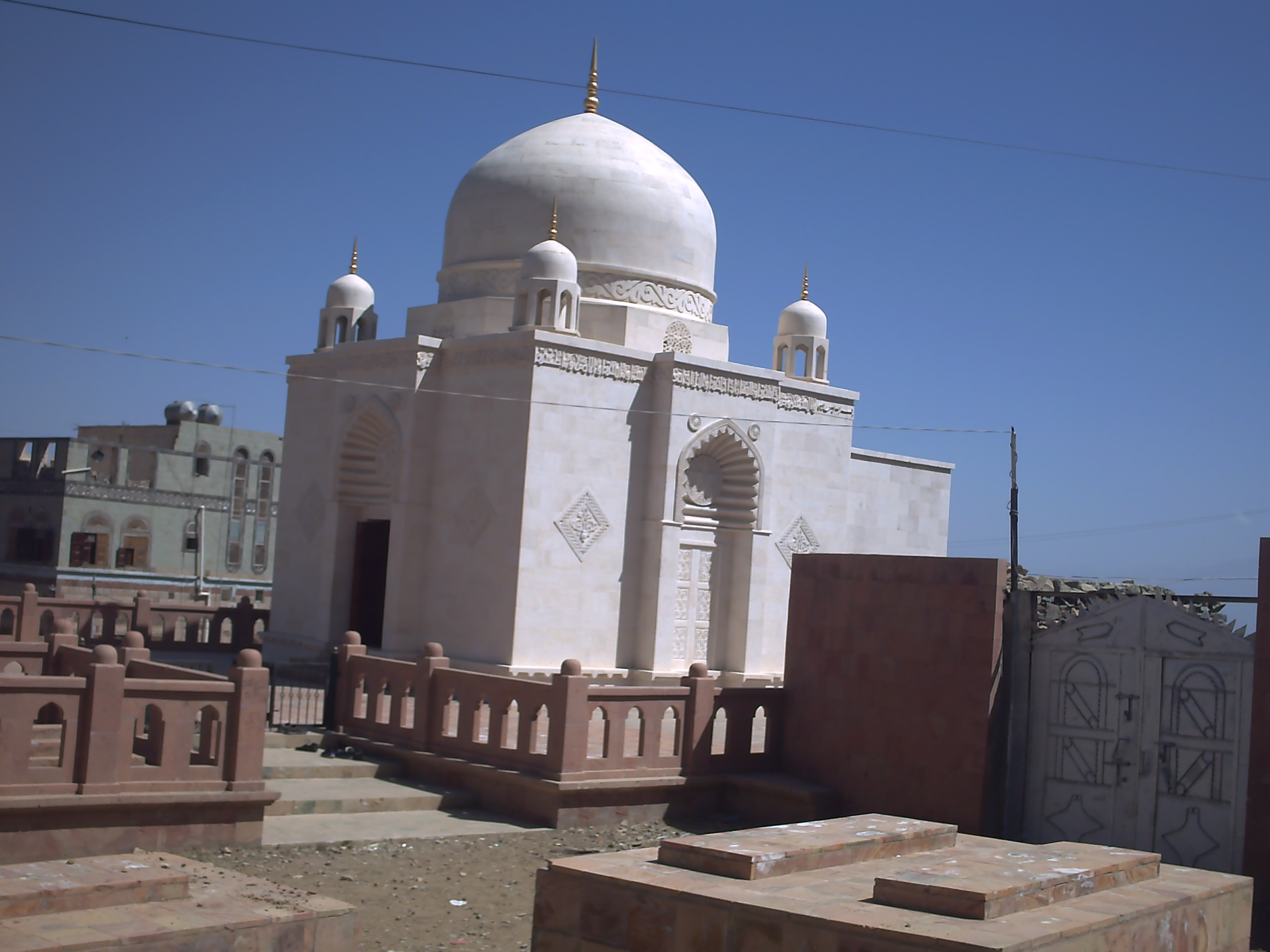
Mausoleum of Ali Shams al-Din, al-Shariqa, Yemen

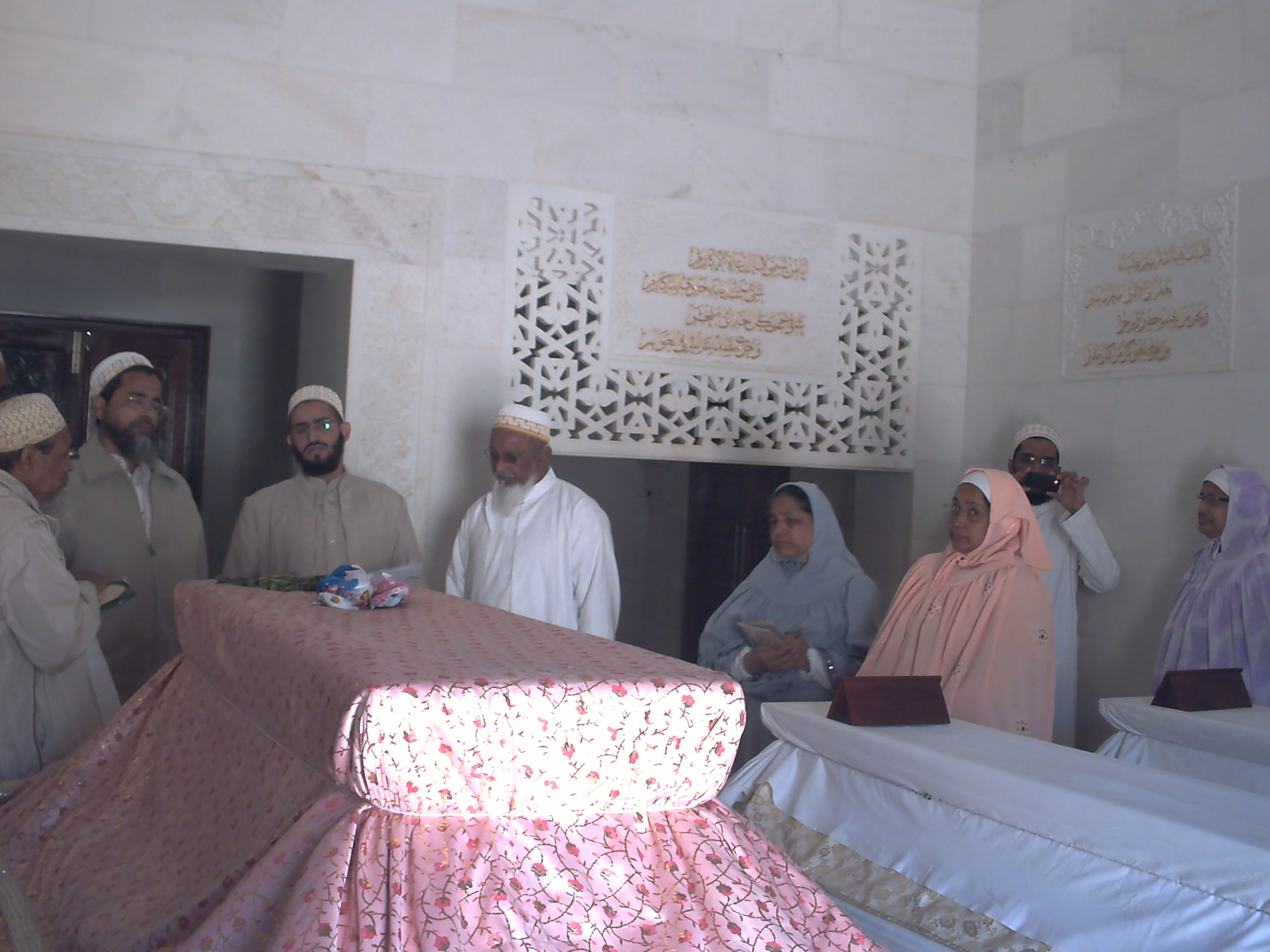
Grave of Ali Shams al-Din and other missionaries, al-Shariqa, Yemen

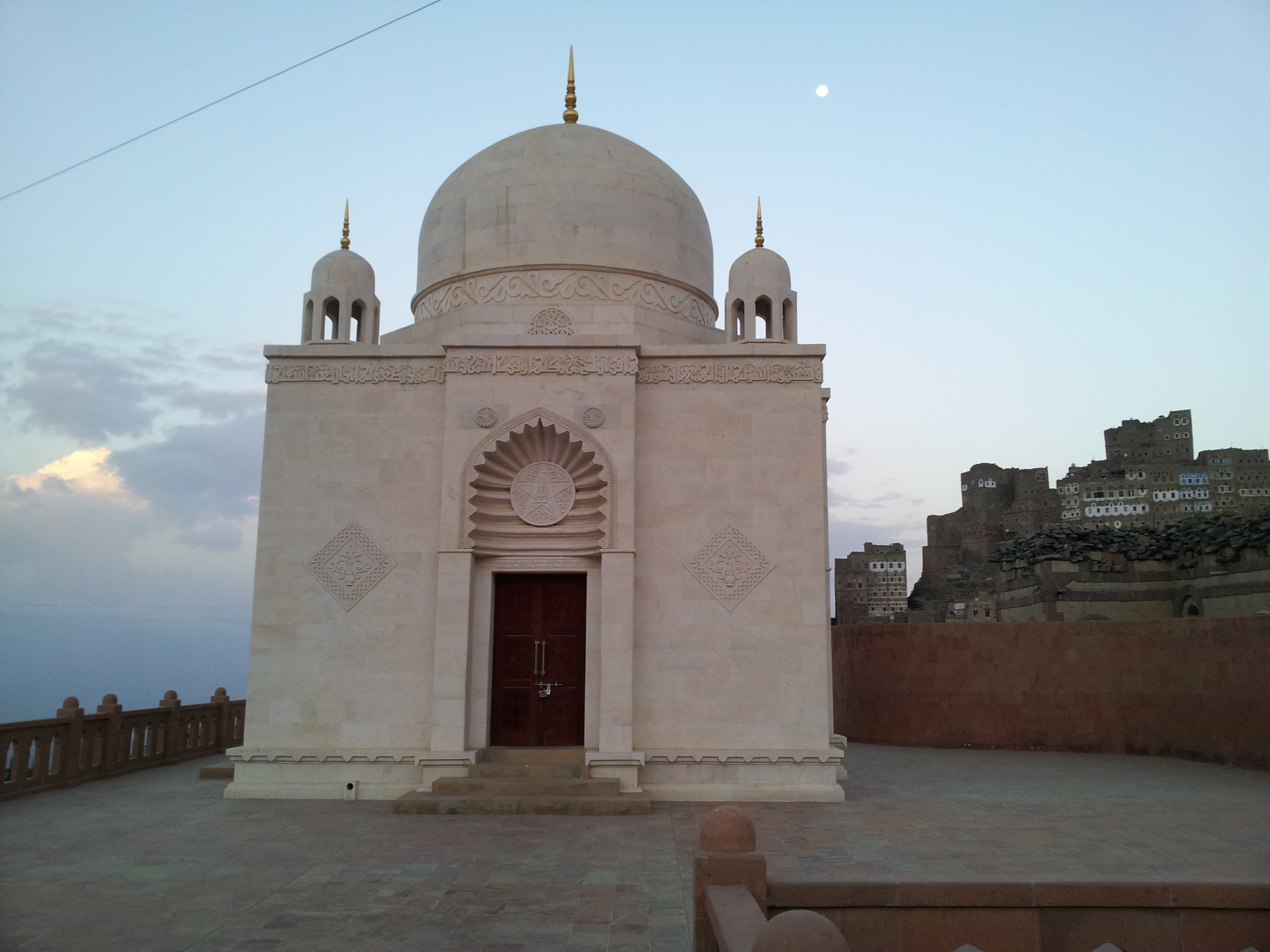
Entrance of the mausoleum

== Sources ==
- Daftary, Farhad (2007). The Ismāʿı̄lı̄s: Their History and Doctrines (Second ed.). Cambridge: Cambridge University Press. ISBN 978-0-521-61636-2.
- Qutbuddin, Tahera (2018). "Idrīs ʿImād al-Dīn". In Fleet, Kate; Krämer, Gudrun; Matringe, Denis; Nawas, John; Rowson, Everett (eds.). Encyclopaedia of Islam (3rd ed.). Brill Online. doi:10.1163/1573-3912_ei3_COM_32368. ISSN 1873-9830.

Shia Islam titles
Ali Shams al-Din II Dā'ī al-Mutlaq Died: 1428 CE Shareqa, Yemen.
| Preceded by al-Hasan Badr al-Din I | 18th Dā'ī al-Mutlaq : 1418–1428 CE | Succeeded by Idris Imad al-Din |
