= Masar (Sanaa) =

Masar مسار
- Sub-district
- Location in Yemen
- Country: Yemen
- Governorate: Sana'a
- District: Manakhah

Population (2004)
  - Total: 8,999
- Time zone: UTC+3

Masar (Arabic: مسار) is a sub-district located in Manakhah District, Sana'a Governorate, Yemen. Masar had a population of 8998 according to the 2004 census.
