= Ayyubid Conquest of Arabia =

Ayyubid conquest of Arabia
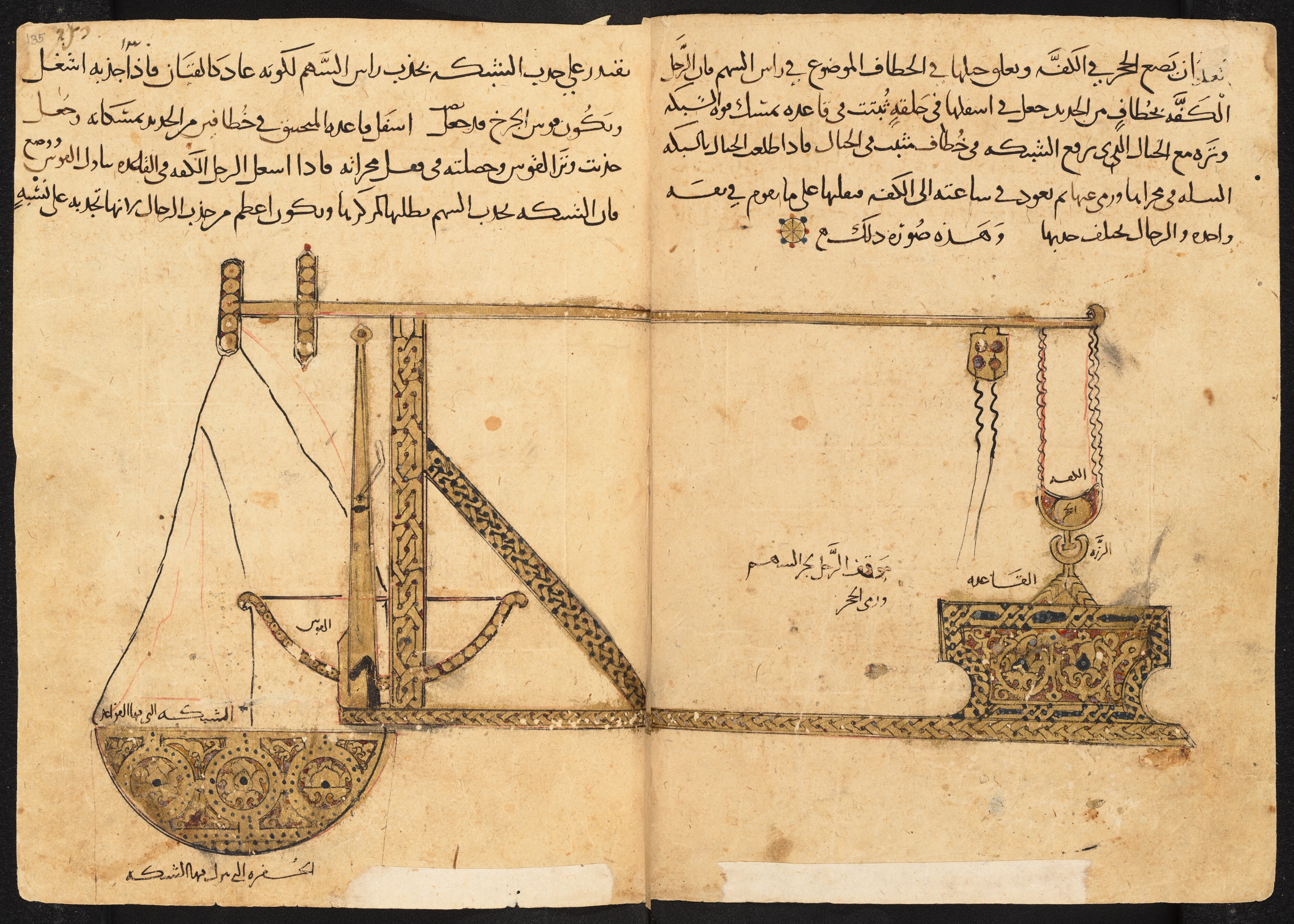
- Arabic trebuchet depicted in the Tabṣira of al-Ṭarsūsī, c. 1170 CE
Date	1173–1228
Location	Yemen, Hejaz, Southern Arabia
Result	Ayyubid victory
Territorial changes	Yemen the Hejaz and parts of Hadramaut brought under Ayyubid control

Belligerents
Ayyubid Sultanate: Hejaz	Hamdanids (Yemen): Yemenites; Sulaymanids; Zurayid dynasty; Mahdids

Commanders and leaders
Saladin; Turan Shah; Tughtakin	Abd an-Nabi (executed); Ahmad (executed); Ibn Bilāl (executed); Al-Mansur Abdallah; al-Mu'izz Ismail (executed)

Strength
Unknown	Unknown

Casualties and losses
Unknown	Heavy

== Mahdid & Ayyubid Sunni pressure ==
A new aggressive Sunni dynasty in Zabid, the Mahdids, besieged Aden in 1164. In the face of the acute threat, the Zurayids sought assistance from fellow Hamdanid sultan of San'a. Together the allies were able to utterly defeat the Mahdid ruler Abd an-Nabi in 1173. Immediately after these events, however, an Ayyubid expedition under prince Turan Shah was dispatched against southern Arabia. When the Ayyubids conquered Aden on 22 June 1174 the rule of the Zurayids ended. Yāsir bin Bilāl, who still attended the affairs of the state, fled the city but was betrayed and turned over to Turan Shah who executed him in 1175.

== Ayyubid conquest of Yemen ==
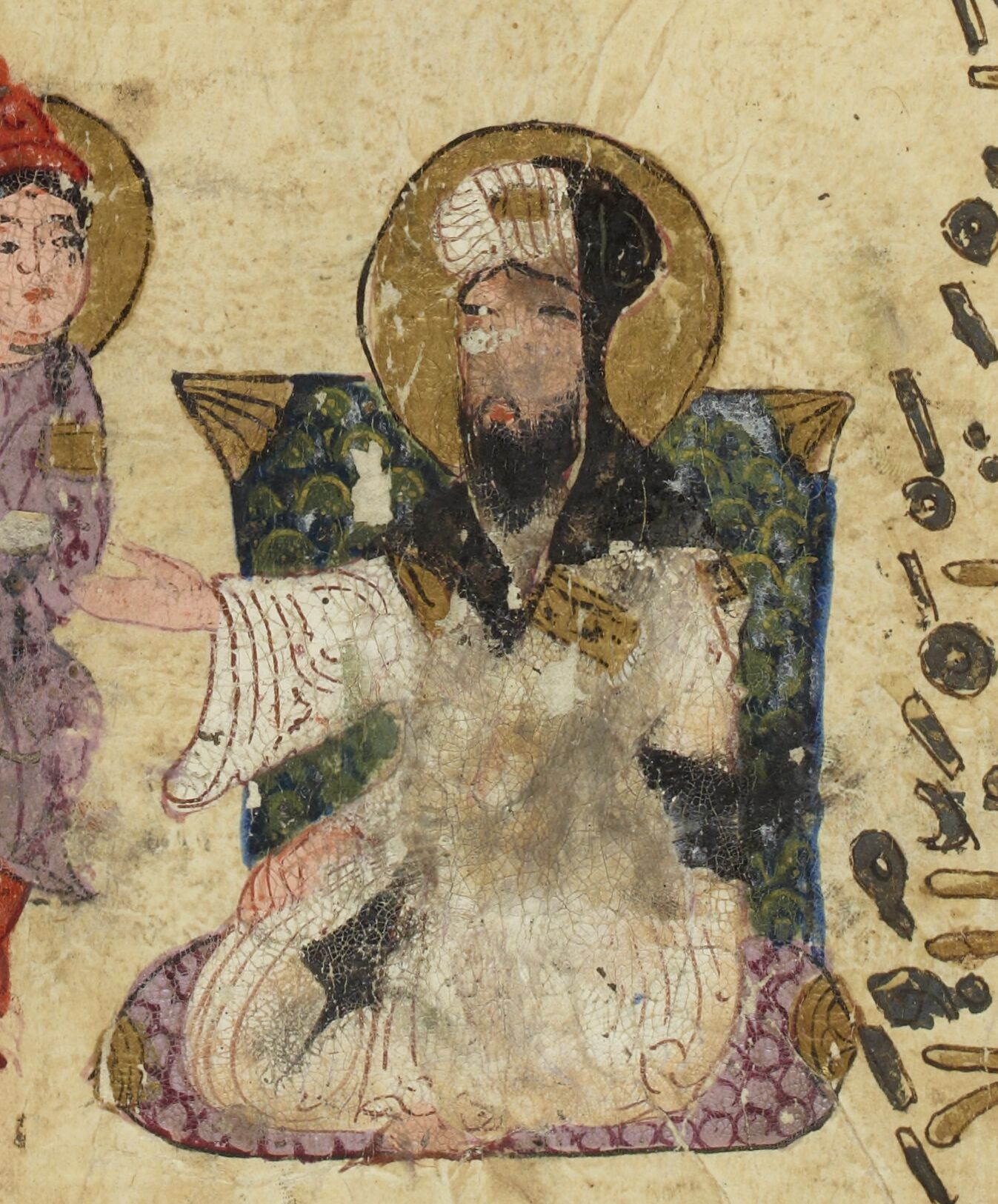
The Qadi of Sa'dah, Yemen, in 1200-1210, according to the Maqamat al-Hariri (BNF 3929)

Abd an-Nabi carried on the expansive policy of the dynasty, attacking the Sulaymanids in northern Tihama whose territories were annexed. The cities Ta'izz and Ibb fell in 1164 and Aden was besieged in the same year. The Zurayids of Aden allied with the Hamdanid sultan of San'a in 1172. Together they managed to defeat the Mahdid forces in 1173. Abd an-Nabi withdrew to Zabid. Shortly after these events, the Ayyubid prince Turan Shah led an expedition to southern Arabia. One of the motives of the Ayyubids to invade Yemen was reportedly the stance of the Mahdids who were considered heretics and associated by outsiders with the Kharijites. Moreover, they had stopped mentioning the Abbasid caliph in the Friday prayer, making them a legitimate object of conquest. Turan Shah found a willing ally in the Sulaymanids, whose ruler had been slain by the Mahdids nine years previously. The Ayyubid troops quickly overran the bulk of Yemen and took Zabid on 13 May 1174. The city was looted and Abd an-Nabi and his brother Ahmad were taken prisoners. Both of them were strangulated in 1176, probably due to an attempt to revive Mahdid rule, and with them the brief era of the Mahdids came to an end. The Mahdids were, after the Hamdanid sultans, the Zurayids and the Sulaymanids, the fourth Yemeni dynasty that was superseded by the Ayyubids.Turan Shah conquered Zabid from the Mahdids in May 1174, then marched toward Aden in June and captured it from the Zurayids. The Hamdanid sultans of Sanaa resisted the Ayyubid in 1175 and it was not until 1189 that the Ayyubids managed to definitely secure Sanaa. The Ayyubid rule was stable in southern and central Yemen where they succeeded in eliminating the mini-states of that region, while Ismaili and Zaidi tribesmen continued to hold out in a number of fortresses. The Ayyubids failed to capture the Zaydis stronghold in northern Yemen. In 1191, Zaydis of Shibam Kawkaban rebelled and killed 700 Ayyubid soldiers. Imam Abdullah bin Hamza proclaimed the imamate in 1197 and fought al-Mu'izz Ismail, the Ayyubid Sultan of Yemen. Imam Abdullah was defeated at first but was able to conquer Sanaa and Dhamar in 1198 al-Mu'izz Ismail was assassinated in 1202 Abdullah bin Hamza carried on the struggle against the Ayyubid until his death in 1217. After his demise, the Zaidi community was split between two rival imams. The Zaydis were dispersed and a truce was signed with the Ayyubid in 1219. The Ayyubid army was defeated in Dhamar in 1226. Ayyubid Sultan Mas'ud Yusuf left for Mecca in 1228 never to return. Other sources suggest that he was forced to leave for Egypt instead in 1223.

== Background ==
In the early 1170s, the Ayyubid ruler Saladin sought to strengthen Egypt's strategic position by extending Ayyubid authority across the Red Sea region. Medieval Muslim historians such as Ibn al-Athir and al-Maqrizi explain that the conquest of Yemen was motivated by fears that, should Egypt fall to Nur ad-Din Zengi, the Ayyubids would require a distant and secure refuge. Yemen's position along the Red Sea Indian Ocean trade routes further enhanced its economic importance, while control of the Hejaz would reinforce Ayyubid legitimacy through sovereignty over the Islamic holy cities of Mecca and Medina.

== Battle ==
In 1173, Saladin dispatched his brother Turan-Shah to lead an expedition into southern Arabia. Ayyubid forces captured Zabid in May 1174, followed later that year by the seizure of the important port city of Aden.Some decades later the dynasty was attacked by a new and belligerent dynasty, the Mahdids, who had recently appropriated Zabid on the fall of the Najahids. The amir Wahhas bin Ghanim fell in battle against the Mahdid lord Abd an-Nabi in 1164. The Sulaymanid defeat was complete and their lands were acquired by the victor. The activities of the Mahdids in Yemen was one of the reasons for the Ayyubid ruler Saladin to dispatch an army against South Arabia under his brother Turan Shah. Wahhas bin Ghanim's brother Qasim, eager to exact revenge for the recent defeat, gladly allied with the Ayyubids and joined his remaining forces with them. The Ayyubid invasion was successful and led to the conquest of the most of Yemen in 1173–1174. With these events, however, the autonomous position of the Sulaymanids came to an end. Qasim died soon after the elimination of the Mahdids.Aden subsequently became the dynasty's principal maritime outlet in the Indian Ocean. In 1175, Turan-Shah advanced into the Yemeni highlands and captured Sana'a, expelling the remaining Hamdanid rulers and effectively unifying Yemen under Ayyubid authority. The campaign also led to the development of an Ayyubid coastal fleet tasked with protecting trade and suppressing piracy along the Red Sea coast. The Ayyubid ruler in Egypt, Saladin sent his brother Turan Shah with an army to South Arabia in the same year. When the Ayyubids reached the outskirts of San'a, Ali bin Hatim fled to a mountain fortress, leaving San'a to be captured in August 1174. Thus ended the rule of Fatimid-affiliated dynasties in San'a. Turan Shah occupied Yemen and ruled there until 1181. Ali bin Hatim nevertheless continued to offer periodic resistance until 1197, and was able to hold San'a for long periods when there was no Ayyubid army around. In 1197 he offered his allegiance to the new Zaydiyyah imam al-Mansur Abdallah.

== Aftermath ==
Following Turan-Shah's departure from Yemen in 1176, a series of local revolts broke out, destabilizing Ayyubid rule. Order was restored by 1182 when Saladin appointed his brother Tughtekin Sayf al-Islam as governor. During this period, Ayyubid officials expanded control into parts of Hadramaut. The conquest ushered in economic growth, marked by improved commercial infrastructure, the minting of local coinage, and new maritime taxation systems. Ultimately, the campaign secured Ayyubid dominance over Red Sea trade routes and established Egyptian hegemony in the region. During the first two decades of Ayyubid over-lordship Zurayid influence (remnants of Zurayid-Sulayhid dynasties) surfaced in the highlands enclaves, until it, too, was eventually suppressed in about 1193 with the surrender of the Damloa castle in Al-Hujariah. Local Sulaymanid lords are mentioned in the chronicles later on as vassals under the Ayyubid dynasty. As late as 1556 the Sulaymanid sharifs held sway locally.

== Sources ==
- Daly, M. W.; Petry, Carl F. (1998), The Cambridge History of Egypt: Islamic Egypt, 640–1517, M.D. Publications Pvt. Ltd, ISBN 978-81-7533-008-5
- Dumper, Michael R.T.; Stanley, Bruce E., eds. (2007), Cities of the Middle East and North Africa: A Historical Encyclopedia, ABC-CLIO, ISBN 978-1-57607-919-5
- Houtsma, Martijn Theodoor; Wensinck, A.J. (1993), E.J. Brill's First Encyclopaedia of Islam, 1913–1936, BRILL, ISBN 90-04-09796-1
- Margariti, Roxani Eleni (2007), Aden & the Indian Ocean trade: 150 years in the life of a medieval Arabian port, UNC Press, ISBN 978-0-8078-3076-5
- Salibi, Kamal S. (1998), The Modern History of Jordan, I.B. Tauris, ISBN 978-1-86064-331-6
