= List of Shia dynasties =

The following is a list of Shia Muslim dynasties.

== North Africa and Europe ==
- Idrisid dynasty (788–985 CE) — (Morocco) - Zaīdī (disputed)
- Fatimid dynasty (909–1171 CE) — (Kabylia) - Isma'īlī
- Banu Kanz (1004–1412 CE) - (Upper Egypt) — Isma'īlī
- Zirid dynasty (973–1148 CE) - (Kabylia) — Isma'īlī
- Kalbids (948–1053) — (Sicily) — Isma'īlī
- Hammudid dynasty (1016-1056) — (Spain) — Zaīdī (disputed)

== Iran and Caucasus ==
- Justanids (791–974 CE) — Zaidi
- Alavids (864–929 CE) — Zaidi
- Aishanids (912–961 CE)
- Ziyarid dynasty (928–1043 CE)
- Buyid dynasty (934–1062 CE) — Zaidi, later converted to Twelver
- Hasanwayhid (959–1047 CE)
- Kakuyids (1008–1051 CE)
- Nizari Ismaili state (1090–1256 CE) — Nizari
- Ilkhanate (1310–1316 CE) — Öljaitü converted to Shi‘ism around 1310 and ruled until 1316, after which the Ilkhanate reverted to Sunnism under his son Abū Saʿīd.
- Sarbadars (1332–1386 CE) — Twelver
- Injuids (1335–1357 CE) — Twelver
- Marashiyan (1359–1582 CE) - Twelver
- Musha'sha'iyyah dynasty (1436–1729 CE) — Musha'sha
- Safavid dynasty (1501–1736 CE) — Twelver
- Erivan Khanate (1604–1828 CE)
- Kartli Bagrationi (1569 — 1737 CE) — Some Bagrationi rulers of this period professed Georgian Orthodoxy or Catholicism, Jesse converted to Sunni Islam in 1724 under Ottoman pressure.
- Kakheti Bagrationi (1605 — 1737 CE) — Some Bagrationi rulers of this period professed Georgian Orthodoxy or Catholicism.
- Afshars (1732-1798 CE)
- Baku Khanate (1753–1806 CE)
- Derbent Khanate (1747–1806 CE)
- Ganja Khanate (1747–1804 CE)
- Talysh Khanate (1747–1828 CE)
- Nakhichevan Khanate (1747–1813 CE)
- Karabakh Khanate (1747–1822 CE)
- Javad Khanate (1747-1805 CE)
- Zand dynasty (1750–1794 CE) - Twelver
- Qajar dynasty (1785–1925 CE)
- Pahlavi dynasty (1925–1979 CE)

== Arabian Peninsula ==
=== Hijaz ===
- Sharifate of Mecca - Zaidi (converted to Sunnism in the Ottoman period)
- Sharifate of Medina - Twelver (converted to Sunnism in the Ottoman period)

=== Yemen ===
- Banu Ukhaidhir (865–1066 CE) — Zaidi
- Rassids (897–1970 CE) — Zaidi
- Sulayhid dynasty (1047–1138 CE) — Ismaili
- Sulaymanids – Ismaili
- Hamdanids (Yemen) – Ismaili
- Zurayids - Ismaili
- Mutawakkilite Kingdom of Yemen (1926–1970 AD) — Zaidi

=== Bahrain ===
- Qarmatians (900–1073 CE) — Isma'ili
- Uyunid Emirate (1073-1253 CE) — Twelver
- Usfurids (1253–1320 CE) — Twelver
- Jarwanid dynasty (1305–1487 CE) — Twelver
- Jabrids dynasty (1487–1524 CE) — Twelver

== Levant and Iraq ==
=== Northern Iraq and Levant ===
- Hamdanid dynasty (890–1004 CE)
- Numayrids (990–1081 CE) (eastern Syria and southeastern Turkey)
- Uqaylid Dynasty (990–1169 CE)
- Mirdasids (1024–1080 CE)
- Banu Ammar (1065 until 1109)
- Harfush dynasty (1483–1865 CE)
- Emirate of Jabal Amil (1710–1980 CE)

=== South and central Iraq ===
- Emirate of Al-Mukhtar (685-687) Al-Mukhtar ruled most of Iraq, except for Basra. His rule also extended to Arminiya and Isfahan.
- Baridis dynasty They ruled Basra between the 10th and 11th centuries.
- Shahin dynasty (941 - 1017 CE) - Formed and ruled over The Batihah, also known as The Great Swamp or The Marsh in the Iraqi Marshes.
- Mazyadids (961–1163 CE) (central and southern Iraq)
- Kingdom of Khaza'il (1534–1921)
- Al-Muntafiq Union (1530-1918) It was a Shiite-Sunni confederation that included tribes in southern and central Iraq

== Indian subcontinent ==
- Soomra dynasty (1026–1351 CE) — Isma'ili
- Bahmani Sultanate (1347–1527 CE)
- Maqpoon dynasty of Skardu baltistan (1200 –1840 CE)
- Yabgo Dynasty of Khaplu baltistan (750–1972 CE)
- Amacha Dynasty of shigar Baltistan (1100 – 1842 CE)
- Gashopa Dynasty of kargil, Ladakh-baltistan (before 1000 – 1600 CE)
- Bidar Sultanate (1489–1619 CE)
- Berar Sultanate (1490–1572 CE)
- Ahmadnagar Sultanate (1490–1636 CE)
- Chak dynasty (1554-1586 CE)
- Qutb Shahi dynasty (1512–1687 CE)
- Adil Shahi dynasty (1490–1686 CE)
- Najm-i-Sani dynasty (1658–1949 CE)
- Nawabs of Oudh (1722–1858 CE)
- Nawabs of Bengal (1757–1880 CE)
- Talpur dynasty (1783–1955 CE)
- Hunza (princely state) (1000s–1974 CE) — Isma'ili
- Nagar (princely state) (4th Century–1974 CE)
- Prithimpassa State (1499-1950)
- Banganapalle State (1665-1948)

== See also ==
- List of Sunni dynasties
- List of Muslim states and dynasties
- List of Shia Muslims flags
