= Al-Muhtasib al-Mujahid Hamzah =

Imam of Zaidi state in Yemen from 1060 to 1067

Al-Muhtasib al-Mujahid Hamzah (died 2 November 1067) was an imam of the Zaidi state in Yemen who ruled from 1060 to 1067.

Hamzah was the son of the imam Abu Hashim al-Hasan, and assisted his father when he proclaimed his da'wa (call for the imamate) in 1031. After the death of imam Abu'l-Fath an-Nasir ad-Dailami in 1053 at the battle of Najd-al-Jah, no new imam appeared for some time. Much of Yemen was dominated by the powerful Sulayhid king Ali as-Sulayhi, who ruled San'a and the land south of it by 1063. In the northern highland, the Zaidis attempted to stall the Sulayhid advance. Hamzah became imam in 1060, being known by the title al-Muhtasib al-Mujahid Hamzah. The title muhtasib meant that he was only imam in the sense of protector of the community, but was not entitled to lead the public prayers or pass legal sentences. His chance seemed to come in 1067, when Ali as-Sulayhi was assaulted and killed by the Najahid ruler Sa'id bin Najah from Zabid. Al-Muhtasib al-Mujahid Hamzah immediately grabbed the opportunity and attacked San'a with 500 cavalry and 15,000 infantry, mainly tribesmen of Hamdan. The attack was however met by the loyal Sulayhid commander Amir az-Zawahi. When the imam and his followers had reached al-Malwa, the Sulayhid forces gave battle on 2 November 1067. The imam was defeated and killed together with one of his sons. A Zaidi clan, the Hamzite Sharifs, was descended from him. His demise was followed by an extended period of 72 years when no Zaidi imam was appointed.

== See also ==
- History of Yemen
- Imams of Yemen
- Rassids

| Vacant Interregnum Title last held by Abu'l-Fath an-Nasir ad-Dailami | Zaydi Imam of Yemen; 1060–1067 | Vacant Interregnum Title next held by al-Mutawakkil Ahmad bin Sulayman |
