= Umara al-Yamani =

Yemeni writer

Umāra al-Yamanī
- Born: 1121 AD (515 AH); Murtan, Yemen
- Died: Saturday, April 6, 1174 AD (2 Ramadan 569 AH); Cairo, Egypt
- Occupations: faqih (juriconsult), historian, poet

Academic work
- Era: Abbasid period
- School or tradition: Shafi'i, Sunni
- Main interests: Traditional Arabic Literature, history
- Notable works: Tarikh al-Yaman (تاريخ اليمن); Mufid fi Akhbar Zabid (مُفِيد في أخبار زبيد); Al-nukat al-'Asriyah (النُّكت العصريَّة في أخبار الوزراء المصريَّة»).

Najm al-Dīn Umāra al-Ḥakamī al-Yamanī (Note: His genealogy is variously given as Abū Muḥammad Umāra ibn Abī al-Ḥasan ʿAlī ibn Raydān ibn Aḥmad by Ibn Khallikan, Abū Muḥammad Umāra ibn Abī al-Ḥasan ʿAlī ibn Aḥmad ibn Muḥammad Zaydān by H. C. Kay, and, following Imad al-Din al-Isfahani, as Abū Ḥamza Umāra ibn ʿAlī ibn Aḥmad by Pieter Smoor.) (Arabic: نجم الدين عمارة الحكمي اليمني) was a Sunni historian, jurist and poet of Yemen of great repute who was closely associated with the late Fatimid Caliphate of Egypt. He was executed by order of Saladin at Cairo on April 6, 1174 for his part in a conspiracy to restore Fatimid rule. His Tarikh al-Yaman is the earliest, and in respects the most important, history of Yemen from the Islamic era.

== Biography ==
=== Origin and early life ===
Umara was born in 1121 in the town of Mertan (مرطان), in Tihama province, in the valley of Was'a south of Mecca. This town has not been identified. Umara's own Tarikh gives the town of al-Zara'ib (الزرائب) in Ibb province in northern Yemen, as his place of birth. The tribal district of the Banu Hakam is indicated by his appellation, al-Hakami. He was descended from the Qahtan tribe through al-Hakam ibn Sa'd al-Ashira of the Banu Madh'hij. In 1136/7, he went to Zabid, where he studied Islamic jurisprudence of the Shafi'i school for four years.

Umara then worked as a teacher and jurist, as well as engaging in trade between Zabid and Aden. During this time he acquired connections with the local dynasties, the Najahids, Zurayids and the Mahdids, and began being composing poems for local dignitaries. When his life was threatened, he left for the Hajj to Mecca in 1154/5, where he came under the protection of the Sharif of Mecca, al-Qasim ibn Hashim ibn Fulayta. The Sharif sent Umara as his envoy to the court of the Fatimid Caliphate in Egypt. Arriving there in May 1155, he received favour and rich gifts by reciting a panegyric qasida in honour of Caliph al-Fa'iz bi-Nasr Allah and the vizier Tala'i ibn Ruzzik. This short extract is a paraphrase:

O that the stars would draw near me that I should form from them a necklace in praise of you; for words are inadequate. [...] A caliph and his vizier, whose justices extends a protecting shade over Islam and the nations. Their generosity is to the Nile’s increase as a diminished stream; that vanquishes the copious rains.

Tala'i ibn Ruzzik—the de facto ruler of Egypt in place of the underage caliph—who liked to surround himself with scholars, jurists, and secretaries, favoured Umara with distinction. Umara resided at the Fatimid capital until December 1155 and by April 1156 had returned to Mecca, before journeying on to Zabid. In 1157 al-Qasim once again sent Umara as envoy to Egypt, where he was to remain until his death.

=== In Egypt ===
Ibn Ruzzik, a zealous Isma'ilite, failed to convert Umara, who remained steadfast to his Sunni orthodox faith and the Shafi'i school. Despite their religious differences and due to Umara's great sociability, they became constant companions, Umara composing numerous eulogiums for the vizier and his sons.

In 1160 al-Fa'iz died aged 11 and Ibn Ruzzik placed his cousin al-Adid, also a minor, on the throne. When Ibn Ruzzik died in 1161, he was briefly succeeded by his son, Ruzzik ibn Tala'i, who took the title al-Malik al-'Ādil al-Nāṣir. Upon al-Adil's assassination in 1162 the rival claimant Shawar was installed as vizier with the aid of the Sultan of Aleppo, atabeg Nur ad-Din Mahmud, whose Kurdish general Shirkuh led his army into Egypt. A five-year struggle for control of the enfeebled Fatimid realm ensued between the Crusaders of the Kingdom of Jerusalem and Nur ad-Din, culminating in the killing of Shawar in 1168, and the accession of Nur ad-Din's representative, Shirkuh, to the vizierate. Shirkuh died later that year, and al-Aḍid invested the vizirate in Shirkuh's nephew, Saladin, who received the title of al-Mālik al-Nasir ("the Succouring King"). By 1171 al-Aḍid was on the point of death when he was formally deposed by Saladin as the last caliph of the Fatimid dynasty, and the suzerainty of the Abbasid Caliphate was restored over Egypt.

=== Conspiracy and execution ===
When a plot, involving Amalric of Jerusalem to restore Fatimid rule, was discovered, Umara was among the eight principal conspirators arrested. He and his co-conspirators were sentenced to death by strangulation. The execution took place at Cairo on a Saturday in April 1174.

Imad ad-Din al-Isfahani wrote in his Kharīdat al-Kasr:

[Umara’s] body was exposed on a cross with those of the other persons who had been accused of plotting against [Saladin] and of inviting the Franks [i.e., the Crusaders] by letter to come and assist in placing the son of al-Aḍid on the throne. But they had received among them a man belonging to the army, who was not a native of Egypt, and this person informed Saladin. When they were brought before the prince, they did not deny their intentions.

Evidence supporting the suspicion of Umara's involvement in the conspiracy had been his proposal for Turan Shah, Saladin’s brother, to lead an invasion force for the conquest of Yemen. The commander’s absence would have greatly increased the chances of the conspiracy succeeding.

Another factor may have been the influential head of Saladin's chancellery, al-Qadi al-Fadil (1135-1200). Umara had for a time enjoyed amical relations with him, and it was al-Faḍl who had suggested to Umara to write a history of Yemen. However they became bitter enemies and his hatred of Umara, and others' of Saladin's adherents, may have fed the suspicions.

Some of Umara's poems in honour of Saladin and his family are included in his Dīwān (collection of poetical works). However, in one addressed to Saladin, entitled Shikāya tal-Mutazallim wa Nikāya tal-Mutaāllim ("Complaint of the oppressed and pains of the afflicted"), he describes his miserable situation. In another, the “People of the Palace”, he openly laments the fall of the Fatimids.

Al-Maqrizi says the following poem composed by Umara was the cause of his death:

They that have been false in their allegiance, will not escape the effects of God's anger [...] Their burning thirst will not be slaked by the hand of the noblest of created beings, the Seal of the Apostles [...] Love of the Imams is the foundation of faith in God, and of all good works. They are the divinely sent Light of true guidance, torches piercing through the darkness of night.

Idris Imad al-Din quotes verses of as-Salih ibn Ruzzik addressed to Umara, pressing him to become a Shi'ite. In the same page he observes “Strange that Umara, who had refused to attach himself to the Fatimid Ismaili doctrines when they ruled, should have given his life to restore them to power.” (Note: Aṣ-Ṣāliḥ offered him a large sum to induce him to become a Shiite.)

== Works ==
- The Land of Yemen and Its History (translated by Henry Cassels Kay into English and published with the title Yaman, its early mediaeval History by Najm ad-Dīn ‘Omārah Al-Ḥakami…; (original texts, with translation and notes; London: Edward Arnold, 1892), by Umarah ibn Ali al-Hakami (1120 or 1121-1174), Ibn Khaldun, and Muhammad ibn Ya'qub Janadi.
- An-Nukat al-Asriya il-Wuzarā il Misriya ((النكت العصريَه، في اخرار الوزراء المصريَه); (contemporary anecdotes respecting the vizirs of Egypt) (Note: A copy of this atreatise amended by the author is in the Bib. du Roi, anciens fonds No.810 He inserts a number of his own poems, and an account of his intercourse with the vizirs Shāwar and as-Salih.)
  - Les finesses contemporaines, récits sur les vizirs d’Égypte; French-Arabic edition published by the French orientalist Hartwig Derenbourg.
- Dīwān of ‘Umāra, or unknown poems by two other editors introduced by ʻAbd al-Raḥmān ibn Ismāʻīl Abū Shāmah; ca. 1250 into his Kitāb al-Rawadhatayn fī Akhbār al-Dawlatayn, (كتاب الروضتين ، في اخبار الدولتين) (Book Of Two Gardens) dedicated to the two rulers Nūr ad-Dīn and Saladin. (Bayrūt, Muʼassasat al-Risālah, 1997.)
- Imad al-Din al-Isfahani (1125-1201), Saladin’s first secretary for Syrian affairs, in Kharīdat al-qaṣr wa-jarīdat al-ʻaṣr published Umāra's poems and a short biography in rhyming prose.
- Mufid fi Akhbar Zabid (مُفِيد في أخبار زبيد) ("Book of Instruction on the History of Zabid"), (Note: The title is omitted in the Book of Chronicles by the illustrious Kadi 'Omarah the Yamanite (Brit. Mus. MS.,). ‘Umāra mentions a book by an early king of the Banu Najah dynasty, Abu at-Tami Jayyash, entitled Kitab al-Mufid fi akhbar Zabid, mentioned in the Kashf az-Zunun.)

== Manuscripts ==
- Manuscript A, Paris 610 de l’ancien fonds; Cat. No. 2147.
- Manuscript B, Gotha 2256, described by Wilhelm Pertsch; Cat. IV, p. 268. (Note: Note: (و كان الفراغ من نسخه ليلة خميس العدس الثامن عشر من جمادى الاولى سنة تسع و خمسين وستّمائة) “The copy was completed the night before the “Thursday of the Lenses" the 18th Jumada al-awwal, 659", This was a popular holiday in Cairo and Egypt celebrated on 20 April 1261 AD.)
- Manuscript C, Oxford 835 (Marsh, 72; Uri, Catalogus p. 181). (Note: D. S. Margoliouth, prof of Arabic language, Oxford University, assessed the copy was made in Egypt. Dr Gottheil professor of Semitic languages, Columbia College New York; began collations.)
- Manuscript D. Asiatic Museum Saint Petersburg, Russia, 298. (Note: Notes by Baron Victor Rosen (Saint Peterburg, 1881, p. 255-256))

== See also ==
- Muslim scholars
