= Lamak ibn Malik =

Lamak ibn Mālik al-Ḥammādī (died c. 1097) was a qadi who was a prominent political and religious figure in 11th-century Yemen, under the Sulayhid dynasty. An Isma'ili Muslim, Lamak was sent to the court of the Isma'ili Fatimid Caliphate for several years from 1062 to 1067 and served as an embassy representing Sulayhid interests. He was instrumental in making Yemen the center of the Isma'ili da‘wah and also for re-establishing the da‘wah in India after its original extinction there. His visit also helped define the relationship between the Fatimids and the Sulayhids and bring their interests into mutual alignment. When he returned to Yemen, he brought some of the Fatimids' Isma'ili literature with him, which indirectly led to its survival of the Ayyubid destruction of Isma'ili manuscripts after they conquered Egypt.

According to Abbas Hamdani, Lamak was responsible for introducing the split between political and religious authority in Sulayhid Yemen after Ali al-Sulayhi's death. Al-Mukarram inherited the status of da‘i from his father along with the monarchy but in practice it was Lamak who carried out these duties, and he had been appointed da‘i himself by al-Mustansir.

== Biography ==
Lamak ibn Malik was from the Banu Hammad branch of the larger Banu Hamdan tribe. He was originally from Lihab in the Jabal Haraz region. Ibn Malik al-Hammadi, the author of the Kashf Asrār al-Bāṭiniyya, may have been Lamak's brother, and they may have had a falling out due to religious and political differences. Lamak was an active member of the Isma'ili community in Yemen. He was taken captive by a local ruler before Ali al-Sulayhi's rise to power and was freed when Ali took Jabal Masar. In 1062, Ali sent him to Cairo to act as an ambassador to the Fatimid caliph al-Mustansir.

The main source for Lamak ibn Malik's visit to Cairo is a highly fictionalized account related in Hatim ibn Ibrahim's Tuhfat al-Qulub. According to Hatim, the original purpose of Lamak's visit was to obtain permission for Ali to visit Egypt, and this trip eventually turned into an extended five-year embassy because al-Mustansir kept postponing their meeting until the next year (indirectly denying Ali permission). During his stay in Cairo, Lamak resided in the Dār al-‘Ilm, the official headquarters of al-Mu'ayyad fi'l-Din al-Shirazi. He studied "esoteric sciences of the faith" during his stay at the Dar al-‘Ilm and then, after five years (c. 1066), he was finally allowed to submit his requests in writing to the caliph. He sent a letter containing 27 questions, and in response al-Mustansir gave him 27 robes, one for each question he asked, to symbolize his progress in 27 levels of "science and wisdom". He was then finally allowed a personal audience with al-Mustansir, who informed him that Ali al-Sulayhi had died. Lamak then received condolences for 5 months and then returned to Yemen. He revealed what he had learned to only 3 people: the Sulayhid ruler al-Mukarram, his wife Arwa (who went on to rule in her own right), and a certain Ahmad ibn Qasim ibn Dalli (who is obscure but who may be related to the Sulayman ibn Abi'l-Qasim ibn Dalli who was among Ali al-Sulayhi's backers in his original uprising at Jabal Masar). Lamak also later shared his knowledge with his son and successor Yahya (himself a co-founder of the da‘wah in Yemen) before he died.

However, this whole episode appears to be "dramatized and romanticized" and should not necessarily be seen as historical fact. Some aspects of Hatim's story don't quite make sense - for example, correspondence between Cairo and Yemen indicates that Lamak stayed in Egypt continuously during those five years, but if al-Mustansir had simply been postponing their meeting, it would have made sense for Lamak to leave and come back the next year. Instead, Ali had probably intended for Lamak to be his resident ambassador in Cairo from the beginning. According to Samer Traboulsi, the original purpose of Lamak's delegation may have been to secure Fatimid permission for Ali's campaign against the Sharif of Mecca in 1062, since Lamak went to Cairo mere months before that campaign took place. Lamak's studying in Cairo under al-Mu'ayyad fi'l-Din may also not have been an accidental result of his stay being postponed, but rather part of the original mission: "as a sign of submission and cooperation", he would have been sent to get religious training in Cairo, possibly alongside others.

Another matter that Lamak would have discussed with Fatimid officials in Cairo was the re-establishment of the Isma'ili da‘wah in India, which was important in furthering the Fatimids' goals of controlling maritime trade on the Indian Ocean. The Fatimids had lost their regional preeminence in the Mediterranean due to the rise of the Seljuk Empire, the loss of their own control over North Africa and Sicily, and the ending of Byzantine grain supplies due to their new alliance with the Seljuks. As a result, the Fatimids were increasingly interested in establishing bases around the Indian Ocean region in order to influence trade and strengthen their own economic position. Abbas Hamdani has speculated that settling the question of who would control the da‘wah in India was another goal of Lamak's mission. Immediately after Lamak's return to Yemen, the da‘i Abdallah was sent to Khambhat in Gujarat. Isma'ilism went on to spread in Gujarat, several of its rulers adopted it, and to this day Gujarat has the largest concentration of Tayyibi Isma'ilis in the world.

Hamdani has also suggested that Lamak was trying to get official Fatimid recognition of Ali's son al-A‘azz as heir to the Sulayhid state. This cannot have been part of his original agenda when he went to Egypt in 1062, however, because according to Imad ad-Din al-Isfahani, Ali had originally made the decision to appoint al-A‘azz as heir in 1063. He also suggested that Lamak's embassy was intended to define the nature of Fatimid-Sulayhid relations, and also to get the Fatimid literature transferred to Yemen; but Traboulsi says that, while these things may have been results of Lamak's stay in Cairo, they were not part of the original intent.

Towards the end of his five-year embassy, in early 1067, Lamak was joined by the influential qadi Imran ibn al-Fadl al-Yami, also from the Banu Hamdan, who was commander-in-chief of the Sulayhid army and the governor of Sanaa. The later rivalry between Imran and Lamak probably began at this time.

Lamak's return to Yemen was caused by Ali's death in 1067. As Ali had not been an ideal submissive ruler (he had disobeyed the caliph's orders twice by attacking Mecca), the Fatimids probably saw an opportunity to influence Yemeni policy-making at that point. Lamak, who had trained under al-Mu'ayyad fi'l-din and therefore well-versed in Fatimid foreign policy aims, was the ideal candidate.

Because of the instability in Cairo at that time, al-Mu'ayyad fi'l-Din sent many Isma'ili sources to Yemen with Lamak. This indirectly resulted in their survival of the general destruction of Isma'ili manuscripts by the Ayyubids when they conquered Egypt later. Lamak also brought an official Fatimid decree expressing support for al-Mukarram's succession.

After his return to Yemen, Lamak became the "executive head" of the da‘wah in Yemen under al-Mukarram and then Arwa, although the Sulayhid rulers were at least nominally in charge. He was originally based at Sanaa and was later transferred to Dhu Jibla and Ibb. He was a trusted advisor to both Arwa and al-Mukarram and a steadfast supporter of Arwa (in contrast to Qadi Imran, who tried to rally the Banu Hamdan against her). The qadi Jarir ibn Yusuf was his assistant.

Lamak's date of death is not known, although it must have been sometime before 1097/8 (491 AH) because his son Yahya appears to have become head of the Yemeni da‘wah at that point.

== Legacy ==
Lamak is known in Tayyibi tradition as Qaḍi al-Quḍāt wa Hādī al-Hudāt and is considered a founding figure of the Tayyibi da‘wah. The later Tayyibi author Hasan ibn Nuh al-Bharushi even described him as a Dā‘ī Balāgh, a higher rank than the Dā‘ī al-Muṭlaq, which was the head of the da‘wah in Yemen.

Hatim's fictionalization of Lamak's stay in Egypt was likely written with symbolic value, to show off Lamak's knowledge and wisdom, as acknowledged by the imam al-Mustansir himself. This is especially the case because this is al-Mustansir, the last Isma'ili imam before the Nizari-Musta'li split after his death. So the Yemeni da‘wah is portrayed with its legitimacy derived from al-Mustansir, whose religious authority was accepted by all Isma'ilis. Also symbolically important is that Lamak is depicted as sharing his knowledge with Arwa al-Sulayhi, who was herself the hujjah of Yemen and the official founder of the Tayyibi da‘wah after the Musta'lis split into the Tayyibis and Hafizis in the 1130s.
