= Al-Mutawakkil Ahmad ibn Sulayman =

Imam of the Zaidi state in Yemen (1106–1171)

Al-Mutawakkil Ahmad bin Sulayman (1106–1171) was an imam of the Zaidi state in Yemen who revived the polity after a long interregnum, wielding power in 1138–1171.

== Rise to the imamate ==
Ahmad bin Sulayman was a fifth-generation descendant of the imam an-Nasir Ahmad (d. 934). His mother was Malikah binti Abdallah, an eight-generation descendant of the Zaidi founding figure al-Qasim ar-Rassi (d. 860). Since the violent death of al-Muhtasib al-Mujahid Hamzah in 1066, no new imam had been appointed in the Zaydiyyah community of the northern Yemeni highlands. The dominating political power in Yemen in the late 11th and early 12th centuries was the Ismailite Sulayhids, whose last important representative was Queen Arwa al-Sulayhi (d. 1138). Meanwhile, the Tihamah lowland was ruled by a Sunni dynasty in Zabid, the Najahids. The most important city in the highland, San'a was ruled by the Hatimid sultans. In the year after Queen Arwa's death, in 1138, Ahmad was acknowledged as imam under the title al-Mutawakkil Ahmad. His early base was in the far north, in Sa'dah, Najran and Jawf. He was considered a political and religious figure of genuine stature. In 1151 a large congregation gathered and spent eight days testing his qualifications for the imamate, including physical fitness, right descent, religious doctrinal learning, etc.

== Theological views ==
The new imam emphasized the unity of the Zaydiyyah brand of Islam, both within and outside Yemen. He was very keen to promote the Islamic learning cultivated among the Zaidi scholars in the Caspian area. A wealth of religious literature from that area was brought into Yemen on the imam's initiative. Al-Mutawakkil Ahmad acknowledged the Shi'ite branch of the Mu'tazila school of theology, which originated from Basra and Baghdad in the eight and ninth centuries and stressed reason and rational thought, as a close ally. On the other hand, he severely criticized the Mutarrifiy and Husayniyya sects of Zaydiyyah for splitting the unity of the creed.

== Fighting against Hatimids and Banu Yam ==
His political activities spread much wider than the pre-1066 imams. In the beginning of his reign, the Zaidi positions were pushed back by the sultan of San'a, Hamid ad-Dawlah Hatim. See Hamdanids (Yemen) for further information. However, in 1150 the imam retaliated. Hamid ad-Dawlah was unable to withstand the tribesmen who supported al-Mutawakkil Ahmad, and was defeated in battle near San'a. The sultan capitulated and was permitted to withdraw from the city with the remnants of his forces. Nevertheless, the Zaidi tribesmen returned to their homes after the victory, and the imam was unable to remain in San'a. In 1154, the imam marched against the Ismaili tribe Banu Yam. The land was plundered and ravaged by the Zaidi troops, and the remnants of the population sought protection in Najran.

== Intervention in the Tihamah ==
Meanwhile, a new dynastic regime from Himyar, the Mahdids, appeared on the scene. From his base in the mountains adjoining the northern Tihamah, their leader Ali bin Mahdi attacked the lowland. In 1157 he besieged the Najahid capital Zabid. The population, driven to desperation, sought assistance from al-Mutawakkil Ahmad and promised to acknowledge him as their prince. Actually the imam entered Zabid with a force. The last Najahid ruler Fatiq III was alleged to be a passive sodomite and a masturbator. According to one account the strict imam ordered Fatiq executed on account of his homosexuality, although he offered to pay an enormous ransom. According to another version, the slave soldiers of the Najahids rose and executed their master. Al-Mutawakkil Ahmad was only able to stay in Zabid for a brief time in 1158. He then withdrew to the highland, leaving the city to its own fate. Zabid was soon captured by Ali bin Mahdi. The Mahdids, however, could only maintain power in lowland Yemen until 1174, when they were superseded by the Ayyubids. In his later years, al-Mutawakkil Ahmad had to contest the rule of Sultan Ali bin Hatim in San'a. The sultan was even able to conquer Sa'dah, the traditional centre of Zaidi rule, for a while. Towards the end of his life, the imam became blind. He died in 1171 and was buried in Haidan.

== See also ==
- Rassids
- Imams of Yemen
- History of Yemen
- Hamdanid sultans

Vacant Interregnum Title last held by al-Muhtasib al-Mujahid Hamzah	Zaydi Imam of Yemen; 1138–1171	Vacant Interregnum Title next held by al-Mansur Abdallah
