= Manakha =

Town in northern Yemen

Coordinates: 15°04′32″N 43°44′26″E

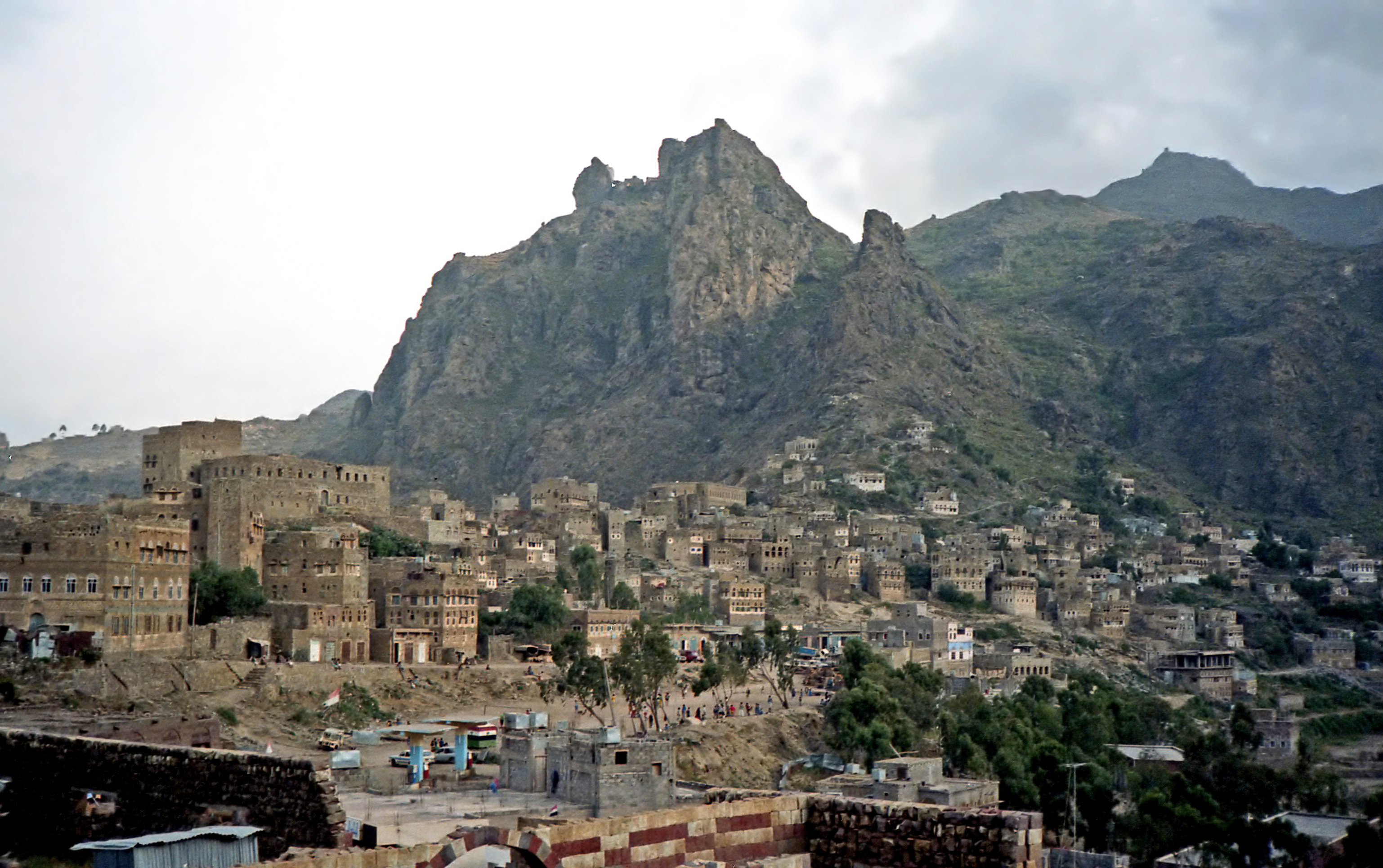
Manakha, Sanaa Governorate

Manakha (Arabic: مناخة) is a town in the Sanaa Governorate in northern Yemen. It is located southwest of Sanaa at the pass of the same name, which leads from the mountains of northern Yemen to the coastal lowlands of the Tihama, being thus a location of strategic importance. The town was founded by the Sulayhid dynasty, and is the major centre of Isma'ilism in Yemen.

== Sources ==
- Schmitz, Charles; Burrowes, Robert D. (2018). "Manakha and Manakha Pass". Historical Dictionary of Yemen (Third ed.). Lanham, Maryland: Rowman & Littlefield. pp. 298–299. ISBN 9781538102329.
