= Najahid dynasty =

Sunni Muslim dynasty of Abyssinian Mamluks (r. 1022–1158)

Najahid dynasty بنو نجاح
- 1022–1158
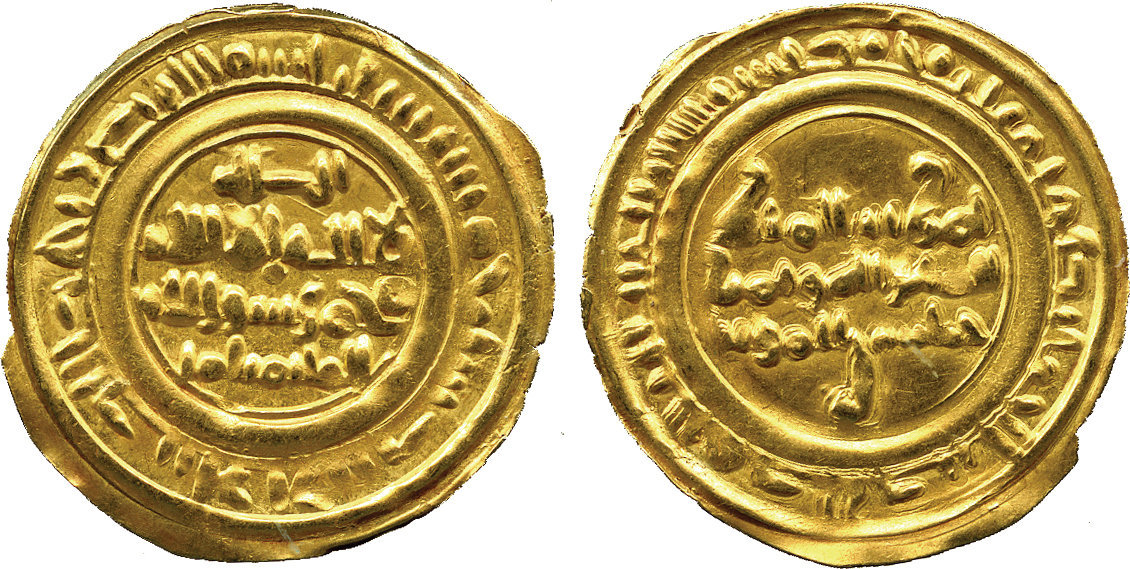
- A coin issued during the reign of the Najahid king Jayyash
- Capital: Zabid
- Common languages: Arabic
- Religion: Sunni Islam
- Government: Emirate
- Emir
  - 1022−1060 (first): Najah
  - 1133–1158: Al-Fatiq III
- Historical era: Early Middle Ages
  - Established: 1022
  - Disestablished: 1158
- Currency: Dinar
Preceded by	Succeeded by
Ziyadids	Mahdids

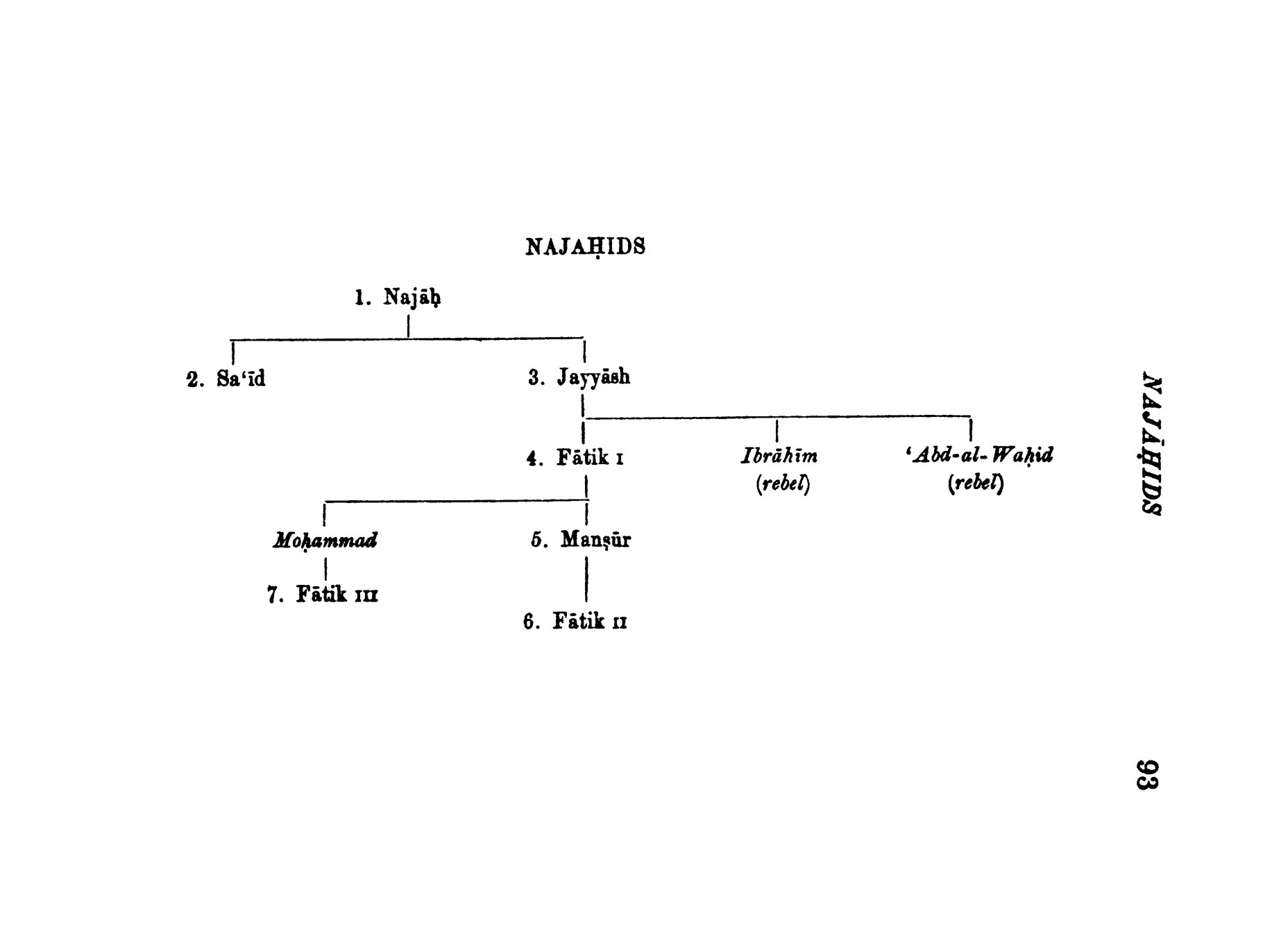
Najahid Dynasty

The Najahid dynasty (Arabic: بنو نجاح; Banū Najāḥ) was a Sunni Muslim dynasty of Abyssinian Mamluks that ruled parts of Yemen from 1022-1158 from its capital at Zabīd. Najah would obtain the recognition of the Abbasid Caliph al-Qadir and would be given the honorific title 'al- Mu'ayyad Nasr al-din'. They faced hostilities from the Shia Ismailis Sulayhids who were loyal to the Fatimids. Their last sovereign was killed by Ali ibn Mahdi the Kharijite in 1158.

== Origins ==
In Yemen, despite its proximity to the African mainland, enslaved soldiers hailed from diverse origins. The presence of military slaves in the region dates back to the 1st millennium and persisted into the early modern era. At its zenith, the Himyarite Kingdom exerted significant influence over large portion of the Arabian Peninsula through its subordinate, the Kinda tribe, who acted as auxiliaries. Initially, soldiers from Abyssinia formed the majority of these military slaves during the Ziyadid era (818-1018). However, they were largely replaced by Turkish and Circassian slaves during the Ayyubid (1171–1260), Rasulid (1229–1454), and Tahirid (1454–1517) dynasties. While these Turkish and Circassian slave soldiers wielded significant political influence in Yemen, particularly during pivotal years such as 1250, 1322, 1442, and 1451, where they acted as kingmakers, they never managed to seize power as their counterparts did in Egypt and Delhi.

The dynasty was established by Najah, one of the many recruited to serve the Ziyadid dynasty. According to Umarah, Najah belonged to the tribe of "Jazali". This tribe seems to have furnished the dynasty. In a short list of Abyssinian tribes the Syrian geographer Al-Dimashqi also has 'the Djazl who are renowned for their beautiful physique'. Dimashqi's "Djazl" might correspond to Umarah's "Jazali," which is otherwise unidentifiable. Nevertheless, some tribes listed for ministers are identifiable. Umarah states that the vizier Muflih hailed from the tribe of "Sahrat." He said of him "Abu Manşür was noted among the most distinguished of his contemporaries for his righteousness, and was remarkable also for his knowledge of affairs, for his skill as a Jurist, for his literary culture, for his handsome appearance, his bravery, his clemency, and for the perfection of his talents as a leader. People were in the habit of saying that, had his lineage been that of Kuraysh, every condition required to fit him for the office of Khalifah would have been combined in his person" The most renowned minister, Surur, Umarah says "He of whom I speak was the noble Kaid Abu Muhammad Surur al-Fatiki. He belonged to the tribe of Amhara, and all I can relate of him is but as a drop in the sea of his great merits"

== History ==
The last Ziyadid king died in 1018, leaving a child behind. The guardianship of the child was eventually assumed by a Nubian slave named Hussein ibn Salama. Husayn ibn Salamah saved the Ziyadid Dynasty from total collapse after a devastating attack by the Yu'firids. Prior to the ascendance of Najahids, the south-western coast of Yemen and Saudi Arabia (Tihama) was dominated by two competing kingdoms since the 9th century; the Yufirids in the city of Sana, and the Ziyadids in the city of Zabid. Husayn recovered the original limits of the Ziyadid kingdom. Husayn ibn Salamah is renowned for his construction work on Zabid. Husayn was then succeeded as vizier by a slave named Marjan, who entrusted the regency to his Abyssinian administers Nafis and Najah, but the former conspired with Marjan to kill the boy-king and assume the title of Sultan. Nafis was of a tyrannical disposition and was dreaded by the people, whilst Najah was merciful, righteous, and beloved. Nafis would end up killing the child king and the princess. The murdered king was the last of his dynasty, with him Banu Ziyad came to an end. Najah, on hearing of the treatment of the king and the princess summoned his neighbors to his assistance, Arabs and non-Arabs. He marched upon Zabid and would eventually kill Nafis and Marjan. Najah prayed over the dead body of the King and the princess and erected a mausoleum over their place of burial. Najah would obtain the recognition of the Abbasid Caliph al-Qadir and would be given the honorific title 'al-Mu'yyadd Nasr al-din' and struck coinage in his own name. He continued to rule over Tihamah, and to exercise control over most of the people of the Highlands, and he was styled King, both in the Khutbah and in official documents, with the title of Our Lord. He had several children, among whom were Said, Jayyash, Mu'arik, adh-Dhakhirah and Mansur.

== Conflict with the Sulayhids ==
While Najah held sway over the coastal areas in southwest Yemen, his dominance on the mainland faced opposition due to the emergence of the Sulayhids, a Shia Ismail dynasty loyal to the Fatimid Caliphate, led by their founder Ali al-Sulayhi. Al-Sulayhi seized control of Sana from the Yufirids, and started directly challenging Najah's rule. According to Umara al-Yamani, he lived in dread of Najah but sought to win his favor, assuming a humble demeanor, but never desisting in his efforts against him, until he succeeded in bringing about his death. This was achieved through the act of sending him a beautiful slave-girl as a gift, who poisoned him. After Najah's death, Sulayhi captured Zabid and forced Najah's children to flee to Dahlak. Out of the children of Najah, Sa'id al-Ahwal and Jayyash were the most effective. Mu'arik, the eldest of the family, in an access of folly committed suicide, and Dhakhirah, she had barely attained the age of puberty. Sa'id departed from Dahlak and concealed himself in Zabid at the house of a man named Rais Mula'ib the Khaulanite. He wrote to his brother, ordering him to come to Zabid, and announcing the speedy downfall of the Sulayhites and the restoration of their rule. Sulayhi, along with his brother and Queen Asma, traveled to Mecca for hajj, whilst on the journey, his army was ambushed and fatally attacked by Sa'id ibn Najah. He plundered and captured the soldiers of as-Sulayhi. Said, continues Jayyash, "became intoxicated with pride, and assumed a haughty demeanor even towards me his brother, son both of his father and of his mother. I advised him to show kindness to the Lady Asma, and to grant an amnesty to the Princes of the Sulayhite family who accompanied her. He then ordered the Sulayhites to be brought forth, and they were slain to the last man. The mercy of God be upon them! I saw an old man among them, who sought to protect himself behind his son, and the spear passed through the bodies of both. May God preserve us from the grievous pressure of calamity ! I shall never forget," continues Jayyash," the sight of as-Sulayhi's head mounted upon the shaft of the royal umbrella". According to Ibn Khaldun, Sulayhi was en route to Mecca under the directive of al-Mustansir Billah, who instructed him to wage war against the Emir of Mecca due to the latter's rejection of Fatimid authority. Three days after the battle, Sa'id left for Zabid with the heads of Sulayhi and his brother, Abdullah al-Sulayhi and a large amount of booty. He then imprisoned Queen Asma and he raised the heads on high, opposite the casement of a house he assigned for her residence. Asma remained a full year the captive of Sa'id ibn Najah. The death of as-Sulayhi made everyone afraid of Sa'id ibn Najah. The governors of the mountain fortresses seized possession of the places confided to their rule, and the authority of al-Mukarram (the son and successor of as-Sulayhi) was all but destroyed. However, Sa'id's authority in Tihamah grew stronger and he sent people to Dahlak to buy twenty thousand men for him. During her captivity, Asma devised a clever plan to send a letter to her son al-Mukarram. She hid the letter inside a loaf of bread and gave it to a beggar, who would then deliver it to al- Mukarram. The Princess wrote to her son as follows:

"I am great with child by (Al-Ahwal) see that thou come unto me before my delivery. If not, everlasting disgrace will ensue"

Al-Mukarram assembled an army of 3,000 horsemen and marched toward Zabid to free his mother from captivity. The Najahid army was defeated and immense numbers were slain. Said al-Ahwal fled the battle field again to Dahlak. Ahmed al-Mukaram found out later that his mother was not pregnant, she thought to excite and stimulate her son to vindication of his honor. He removed the two heads and buried them and appointed his uncle As'ad ibn Shihab to govern Zabid and its dependencies in Tihama and returned to Sana'a. In 1087, Said al-Ahwal returned to Zabid but was killed that same year by Ahmed al-Mukkaram. al-Mustansir Billah, the Fatimid Caliph, sent to Asma, two letters congratulating her on her safe return from captivity. Both started with the following:

"From Imam al-Mustansir, commander of the faithful, to al-Hurra (lit. the free - it was used by most Yemeni tribes for their elite women), the noble, the pure, the pious, the honoured, guardian of the faithful, mother of the loyal princes, God protect her"

Jayyash, the other son of Najah, fled to India and stayed there for six months with his wazir Khalf, the son of Abu Tahir the Umayyad (apparently descendant of Suleiman ibn Hisham son of Abd al-Malik) Jayyash returned to Zabid disguised as an Indian by allowing his hair to grow long and covered one of his eyes with a black cloth. He also brought with him 3,000 Oghuz Turks (The presence of Turks would drastically increase by the Ayyubid period and would later be the origins of the Rasulid dynasty). Being a Sunni, he enjoyed the support of the population and easily gained power in the city. A dispute between two Sulayhids officials in Zabid played into his hands, Jayyash overheard one of them tell the other:

"By Allah, if I could find a dog of the family of Najah, of a certainty I would make him King of Zabid"

This was said in consequence of some cause of offence that had arisen between the governor As'ad ibn Shibab and Aly ibn al Kumm (who was wazir to the governor appointed by the King al-Mukarram). He made use of his skill at chess to ingratiate himself with the vizier. Jayyash got close with the vizier and began playing chess with him often, but he inadvertently revealed his identity with a slip of the tongue after a game where he let Husain, the vizier's son, win, following a promise of a reward from his father. Jayyash, after accidentally revealing himself, attempted to flee. The vizier caught up to him, but he did not expose him. They both swore an oath on the Quran. The vizier had told him what had occurred could not long remain concealed from As'ad ibn Shibab, and in reply Jayyash informed him that he had five thousand spearmen in the city. "Victory is in thy hands,' replied 'Aly; declare thyself publicly." Jayyash told 'Aly that he unwilling that harm should befall As'ad ibn Shihab, because of the kindness the vizier had displayed for him. Jayyash commanded the drums and trumpets to be played, prompting the residents of the city to take up arms alongside him and Ibn Shihab was taken prisoner." Naught can defend us against you, O family of Najah," he said to Jayyash," for man's fortunes are as the buckets of a well (which rise full of water for the benefit now of one, then of another). But such as I ask not for mercy."" And such as thou, O Abu Hassan," answered Jayyash," shall not suffer harm." Jayyash treated As'ad and his children with kindness, and sent him forth with all the property he possessed, and with all his family to Sana'a. Jayyash continued to rule securely with no hardship from the Highlands until his death.

== Fall ==
Following his death, confusion prevailed and power was exercised by a series of ministers. He was followed by his son Fatik, born to an Indian concubine, whose reign was relatively brief and marred by a succession dispute with his brothers. This conflict persisted even after his death in 1109. Fatik was succeeded by his son al-Mansur, who fled the discord among his uncles and sought refuge and backing from the Sulayhids. Eventually, he was established in Zabīd by the Ṣulayḥids. Queen Arwa al-Sulayhi, the last Sulayhid sovereign died in 1138. After her demise, Yemen was split between several contenders. Zaydi Immamte was revived in Najran, Sa'dah, and Jawf after 72 years of absence. The Hamdanid sultans were sovereign of Sana'a and Najahid viziers were ruling Zabid independently. Mansur foiled an assassination attempt plotted by his vazir, replacing him afterward. However, he would later fall victim to poisoning orchestrated by his subsequent vazir, Mann Allah. In the following year he defeated at Zabid, Najib ad-Dawla, whom the Fatimids had sent from Egypt as Sulayhid power was weakening. al-Mansur's concubine, Alam al-Malika contrived a plan for his death in which she succeed. He was succeeded as vazir by a man named Ruzayk and later al-Muflih. Alam, however, opposed al-Muflih and supported her favorites Surur and Ikbal, although they were not on good terms themselves. Their disputes led to conflicts where other rulers were brought against Zabid. Ikbal had Fatik II killed in 531/1137, and he was succeeded by his cousin, Fatik III who had a relatively long reign though effective power remained with the viziers Surur, who had been effectively in control since 529/1135, was assassinated in a Zabid mosque in 551/1156 by an envoy of the Mahdids while in prayer. When the Zaydi Imam al-Mutawakkil Ahmad b. Sulayman was called upon for help by the Najahids, he demanded that Fatik should be deposed and he be recognized as the lord of Zabid. This condition was accepted, but eventually, the Mahdids would capture Zabid. According to Umarah, Ibn Mahdi, followed the Hanafi school of thought but he added to its fundamental articles of faith, the doctrine that regards sin as infidelity and punishable with death. He held in like manner that the penalty of death was to be inflicted upon all professing Muslims who opposed his teaching, that it was lawful to reduce their captured women to the condition of concubines, their children to slavery, and to treat their country as a land of infidels. Their reign was short-lived, as Yemen quickly came under the control of the Ayyubids. Among the causes that contributed to the success of Ibn Mahdi, Umarah says, "was the circumstance that their chiefs were filled with jealousy and envy, at the sight of the eminence attained by the Surur. After his death the closed gates of evil were thrown open against the dynasty, and the bonds of its stability were unloose" Surur was known for his military strength and leadership. He had secured dominance through successful campaigns and maintained firm control over the region. Surur’s regional dominance prompted the Ḥasanī sharif of Mecca to send an envoy to negotiate a truce. He defeated the Sulaymanids, who used to pay an annual tribute of 60,000 dinars and gained significant public admiration. According to Umarah, the people on his arrival from al-Mahjam, used to go forth from the city in crowds to meet him. They divided themselves into classes and stood on a lofty hill awaiting his arrival. The first to salute him were the Jurists of the Malikite, the Hanafite and the Shiifi'ite schools. The Prince used to dismount in token of respect, a thing he did for no other class. They were followed by the merchants, after whose departure the soldiery came forth in crowds. After the morning prayer, he would often embark on various activities such as visiting a Jurist, attending to the sick, offering condolences to mourners, joining festivities, or participating in weddings. His visits were not limited to military leaders, scholars, or wealthy merchants; he also made time for individuals of lower status. Anyone who sought his attention would receive it, regardless of their rank. Umarah concluded about them, saying, "No Arab king surpassed them in personal merit or in aught but nobility of lineage. They were noted for their generosity, for their brilliant estate (architecture), and for combining renown in war with celebrated achievements in times of peace."

== List of rulers ==
- al-Mu'ayyad Najah 1022−1062
- Sa'id al-Ahwal 1062−1080
- Abu't-Tami Jayyash 1080−1089
- Fatiq ibn Jayyash 1089−1104
- al-Mansur ibn Fatiq 1104−1109
- al-Fatiq II-Mansur 1109−1123
- al-Fatiq III ibn Muhammad ibn Mansur 1123−1158

== Literature ==
- Henry Cassels Kay (1999), Yaman: its early medieval history, Adegi Graphics LLC. ISBN 1-4212-6464-1.
