= Sulaymanids =

Yemeni sharif dynasty

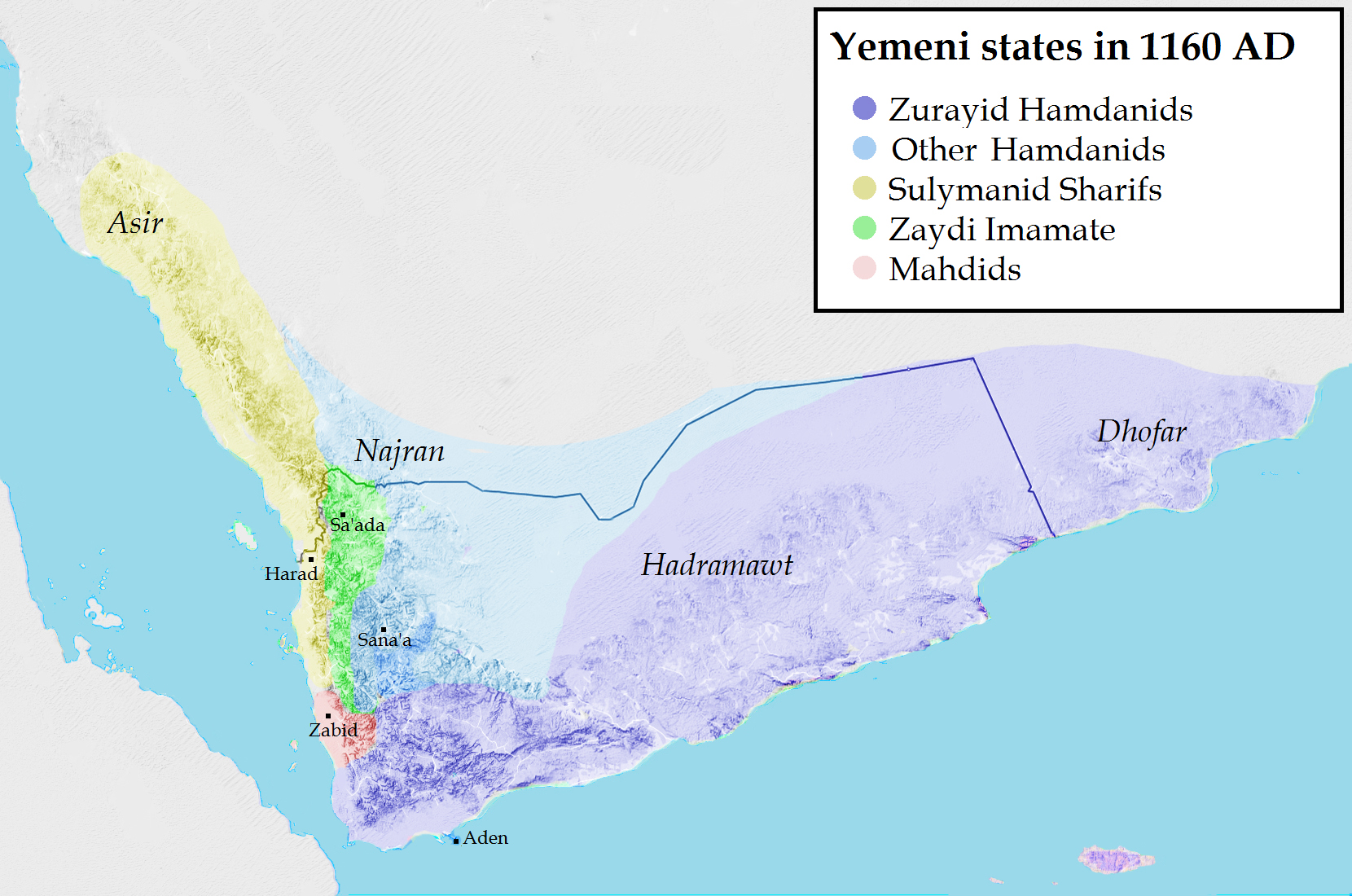
Yemeni States around 1160 AD

The Sulaymanids (Arabic: السليمانيون, romanized: as-Sulaymāniyyūn) were a sharif dynasty from the line of the Muhammad's grandson Hasan bin Ali which ruled around 1063–1174. Their centre of power lay in Jazan in currently Saudi Arabia, Southern Arabia back then since 1020 where they soon achieved a political and social status that enabled them to establish a strong Hereditary Monarchy before the arrival of the Ottoman Empire which destroyed them

== Expulsion from Mecca ==
Family tree of the early sharifian dynasties of Mecca, with the line of Sulayman ibn Abdallah in red.

The chronology of the history of the dynasty is not very well established. Their name is derived from Sulayman bin Abdallah, the grandson of Musa al-Jawn bin Abd Allah al-Mahd, a fifth-generation descendant of the imam Hasan bin Ali. The clan lived in Mecca at the time when the Sulayhid dynasty extended its influence in Yemen and into Hijaz to the north. In 1061 the last amir of Mecca of the old Musawi line died. Now the Sulaymanid clan attempted to dominate the city by violent means. The following years were unsettled and the traditional gate-keepers of the Kaaba, the Shabi clan, appropriated all the gold and silver in the religious premises. The disturbances served as a pretext for King Ali as-Sulayhi to intervene. He performed the hajj in 1063 with a large retinue and restored order in Mecca. The sharifs asked Ali as-Sulayhi to instal one of their kin as amir and then leave the holy city. The king appointed the sharif Abu Hashim Muhammad as lord in Mecca, starting the Hawashim line of sharifs in the city. However, the Sulaymanid headman Hamza bin Wahhas felt that his own line had been slighted. A conflict resulted and Hamza bin Wahhas was driven out of Mecca in about 1063 or 1069. He then moved to Yemen and established a base in the northern part of the coastal lowland where the family ruled as amirs. The era of the Sulaymanids thus overlapped with a number of Yemeni dynasties: the Sulayhids, Hamdanid sultans, Rassids, Najahids, Zurayids and Mahdids.

== Defeat and revenge ==
The chronicles give relatively little information about the Sulaymanids and tend to mix them up with the Rassids of Sa'dah. It is established, however, that they held a certain authority in the northern Tihama and were involved in the affairs of the more powerful slave dynasty of the Najahids in Zabid. The Sulaymanid sharifs observed a vassal relation to the rulers of Zabid and paid 60,000 dinars per year in tribute. Hamza's son Yahya bin Hamza assisted the Najahid ruler Jayyash when the latter defeated the Sulayhid general Saba in 1077. In the next generation Ghanim bin Yahya involved in the internal politics of the Zaydiyyah polity of the northern highlands in 1117. In about 1132 or 1134 he meddled in a civil war between the Najahid wazir Surur and Muflih. He moved towards Zabid with 1,000 cavalry and 10,000 infantry and joined forces with Muflih but was defeated at al-Mahjam. Muflih died soon after the defeat, and the wazir of Ghanim managed to make peace with the court at Zabid. Some decades later the dynasty was attacked by a new and belligerent dynasty, the Mahdids, who had recently appropriated Zabid on the fall of the Najahids. The amir Wahhas bin Ghanim fell in battle against the Mahdid lord Abd an-Nabi in 1164. The Sulaymanid defeat was complete and their lands were acquired by the victor. The activities of the Mahdids in Yemen was one of the reasons for the Ayyubid ruler Saladin to dispatch an army against South Arabia under his brother Turan Shah. Wahhas bin Ghanim's brother Qasim, eager to exact revenge for the recent defeat, gladly allied with the Ayyubids and joined his remaining forces with them. The Ayyubid invasion was successful and led to the conquest of the most of Yemen in 1173–1174. With these events, however, the autonomous position of the Sulaymanids came to an end. Qasim died soon after the elimination of the Mahdids. Local Sulaymanid lords are mentioned in the chronicles later on as vassals under the Ayyubid dynasty. As late as 1556 the Sulaymanid sharifs held sway locally.

== List of rulers ==
- Sulaimān Bin ʿAbd Allāh
- Dā'wūd Bin Sulaimān
- Abū'l-Fātīk ʿAbd Allāh Bin Dā'wūd
- ʿAbd ar-Rahmān Bin ʿAbd Allāh
- Abū't-Taiyib Dā'wūd Bin ʿAbd ar-Rahmān
- Muḥammad Bin ʿAbd ar-Rahmān
- Wahhās Bin Dā'wūd
- Hamza Bin Wahhās
- ʿĪsā Bin Wahhās
- ʿUlāiy Bin ʿĪsā

== See also ==
- History of Yemen
- Islamic history of Yemen
- Alids
- Hashemites
- Sharif of Mecca

== Literature ==
- Smith, G. Rex (1987). "Politische Geschichte des islamischen Jemen bis zur ersten türkischen Invasion (1 bis 945 Hidschra = 633 bis 1538 n. Chr.)" [Political History of Islamic Yemen until the First Turkish Invasion (1 to 945 AH = 633 to 1538 AD)]. In Daum, Werner (ed.). Jemen. 3000 Jahre Kunst und Kultur des glücklichen Arabien [Yemen. 3000 Years of Art and Civilisation in Arabia Felix]. Innsbruck and Frankfurt a.M.: Pinguin. pp. 136–154. ISBN 3-7016-2251-5.
