= Asma bint Shihab =

Queen and co-ruler of Yemen (died 1087)

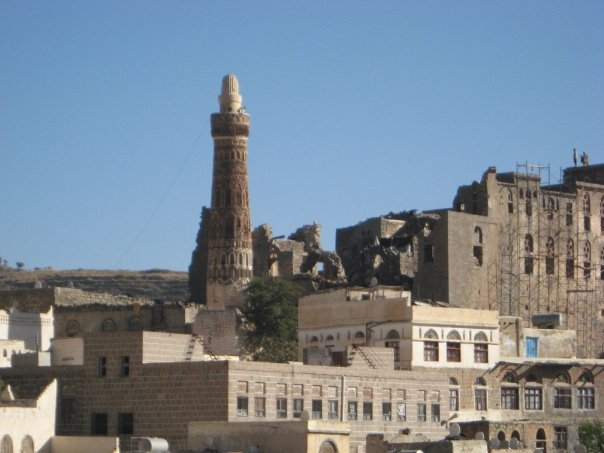
al-Hurrat-ul Malika Palace in Yemen

Asma Bint Shihab al-Sulayhiyya (Arabic: أسماء بنت شهاب الصليحي; died 1087) was the queen and co-ruler of Yemen in co-regency with her cousin and spouse, Ali al-Sulayhi, and later her son Ahmad al-Mukkaram, and daughter-in-law, Arwa al-Sulayhi, from 1047 until 1087. Her full title as sovereign, "al-Sayyida al-Hurra" translates to "The noble lady who is free and independent, the woman sovereign who bows to no superior authority." As female sovereign, Asma bint Shihab has an almost unique position in history: though there were more female monarchs in the international Muslim world, Asma bint Shihab and Arwa al-Sulayhi were the only female monarchs in the Muslim Arab world to have had the khutba proclaimed in their name in the mosques as sovereigns.

== Life ==
Asma bint Shihab married her cousin, Ali al-Sulayhi, sultan and founder of the Sulayhid dynasty. The marriage between Ali and Asma was reportedly a happy one, and Ali relied on her support on his way to power and participated in the sacrifices his religious faith placed upon him.

=== First reign ===
When Ali became king in 1047, he named her queen, malika, but not merely his consort, but his formally acknowledged co-ruler and political partner, who governed the realm of Yemen by his side. In recognition of this, her name was proclaimed alongside that of her spouse in the Khutba, the traditional privilege of a sovereign in a Muslim state: 'the khutba was proclaimed from the pulpits of the mosques of Yemen in her husband's name and in her name', after the Fatimid sovereign and her husband: 'May Allah prolong the days of al-Hurra the perfect, who manages the affairs of the faithful with care.' This was the first time ever in history when the name of a woman had been proclaimed in the khutba. Another almost unique occurrence was that queen Asma bint Shihab "attended councils with her face uncovered", that is to say unveiled.

Muhammad al-Thawr described her: "She was one of the most famous women of her time and one of the most powerful. She was munificent. She was a poetess who composed verses. Among the praises given her husband al-Sulayhi by the poets was the fact that he had her for a wife ... . When he ascertained the perfection of her character, her husband entrusted the management of state business to her. He rarely made decisions that went against her advice and [...] regarded her with very great respect and never gave any other opinion precedence over hers."

In 1067, during the pilgrimage to Mecca, the Banu Najah clan under Sa'id Ibn Najah, the prince of Zabid, attacked the travel party of Ali and Asma, killed Ali and took Asma prisoner. She was sequestered in a secret prison in Zabid, and reportedly, the severed head of her spouse was planted on a pole visible from her cell. After a year's imprisonment, she managed to get a message through to her son and daughter-in-law in Sanaa, and her son stormed Zabid and freed her.

=== Second reign ===
Asma returned to her realm and assisted her son, Ahmad al-Mukkaram, and daughter-in-law, Arwa al-Sulayhi, with the management of the realm until she died. When she met her son al-Mukarram, she confirmed him as his father's successor, but when he was paralysed shortly afterward, she retook control as the co-regent of the realm together with her daughter-in-law Arwa, who was to be her co-ruler in accordance with the will of her son, as he was himself unable to rule because of his condition.

== Legacy ==
Queen Asma was sometime affectionally referred to as the Little Queen of Sheba, according to Muhammad al-Thawr, "Some poets, carried away by their admiration of Asma, went so far as to declaim that if the throne of the queen of Sheba had been magnificent, that of Asma was still more so." This is somewhat remarkable, as the queen of Sheba belonged to the jahiliyya, the time before Islam, which was traditionally viewed as a negative one. Another name used both for her and her daughter-in-law and co-regent was malika hazima: malika means queen, and hazim was an epithet awarded people regarded to have shown the utmost wisdom and judgement in political affairs.

== Sources ==
- Daftary, Farhad (1999). "Sayyida Hurra: The Isma'ili Sulayhid Queen of Yemen". In Gavin Hambly (ed.). Women in the Medieval Islamic World. Palgrave Macmillan. pp. 117–130. ISBN 978-0-312-22451-6.
- Mernissi, Fatima; Lakeland, Mary Jo (2003). The Forgotten Queens of Islam (PDF). University of Minnesota Press. ISBN 0-8166-2439-9.
