= Zurayid dynasty =

Yemeni dynasty of the 11th and 12th centuries

Zurayid Dynasty بنو زريع Banū Zuraiʿ
- 1083–1174
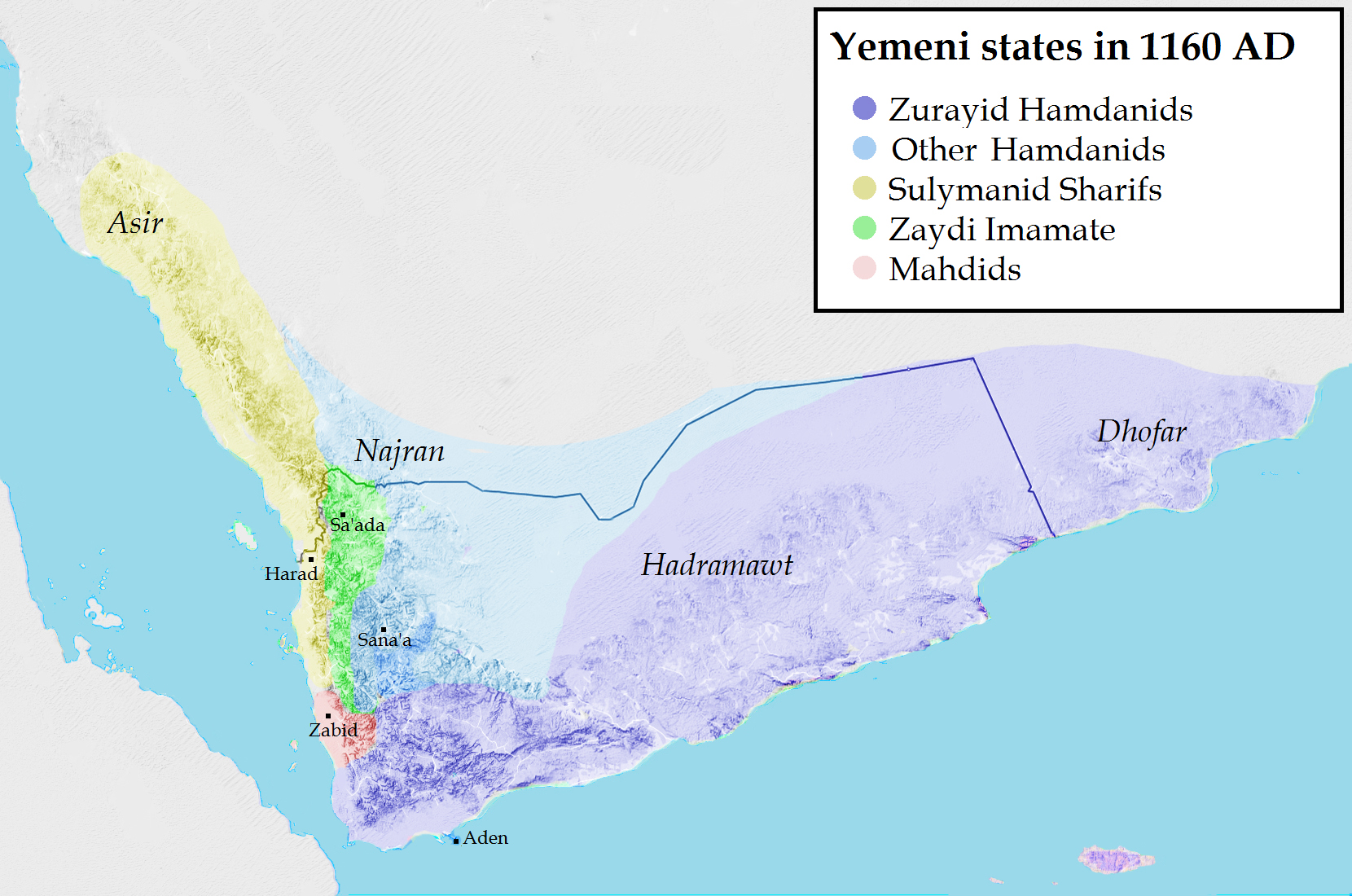
- Yemeni states in 1160 with Zurayids in Purple
- Capital: Aden
- Common languages: Yemeni Arabic
- Religion: Hafizi Isma'ilism
- Ruler
- Historical era: Middle Ages
  - Established: 1083
  - Disestablished: 1174
- Currency: Dinar
Preceded by	Succeeded by
Sulayhids	Ayyubids

The Zurayʿid dynasty (Arabic: بنو زريع, romanized: Banū Zurayʿ), were a Banu Hamdan ruling dynasty based in Yemen in the time between 1083 and 1174. The centre of its power was Aden. The Zurayids suffered the same fate as the Hamdanid sultans, the Sulaymanids and the Mahdids, since their lands were taken over by the Ayyubid dynasty and they were executed. The Zurayʿis were Hafizi Isma'ili Shi'a who followed the Fatimid Caliphate, which was based in Cairo.

== The Sulayhid connection ==
The Zurayid dynasty had a strong affiliation with Sulayhids, starting with Ismaili Hamdani common origin, vassalage & eventually intermarriage with the last Sulyahid Queen.

=== Ismaili Hamdani common origin ===
Both the Sulayhid & Zurayid dynasties were founded by Ismaili Hamdani religious dais, who preached Ismailism with the support of the Fatimid Caliphate (at that time encompassing North Africa, Sicily & parts of the Levant), they were also tribally affiliated with Hamdan, competing with the Sunni Himyarite dynasties & rising Zaydi state in Sa'ada, this Ismaili connection eventually lead to the demise of the Hamdani Ismaili dynasties, as they were replaced by the Sunni & Zaydi dynasties, forcing the Hamdan clans to convert to Zaydi or Sunni sects (with the exception of the Haraz & Najran Ismaili enclaves).

=== Vassals of the Sulayhids ===
About the history of the dynasty we have only insufficient information. What we know mostly derives from the twelfth-century chronicle of 'Umara, who had personal contacts with the last princes. According to his account, the Sulayhid ruler Ali al-Sulayhi (d. 1066 or 1081) subdued the important port Aden which was ruled by the Banu Ma'n, in 1062. This family were also masters of Lahij, Abyan, Shihr and Hadramawt. The Himyarite clan of Banu Ma'n paid tribute until the death of Ali and then declared their independence. However, Ali's son Al-Mukarram Ahmad immediately invested Aden and put an end to the rule of the family. Instead, two brothers called Al-Abbas and Al-Msaod, sons of Al-Karam, were summoned. The brothers were placed in power in 1083 and shared the governmental affairs between them. Al-Abbas resided in Ta'kar and took care of the trade with the interior, while Al-Msaod resided in the castle al-Khadra and handled shipping. About 100,000 dinars were paid in tribute each year to al-Mukarram.

=== Marriage & absorbing the Sulayhid dynasty ===
After taking control of coastal Southern Arabia (Taiz to Dhofar), King Muhammad bin Saba married the last Sulayhid Queen Arwa Al-Sughra & by effect inherited the remaining Sulayhid possessions, Zurayid control remained direct in Central, South Yemen & nominal in Northern Yemen until the dynasty was ended by the Ayyubid expansion.

== Rule in Aden & Lahj ==
Al-Abbas died in 1084. His son Zuray, who gave the dynasty its name, proceeded to rule together with his uncle Al-Msaod. They took part in the Sulayhid leader al-Mufaddal's campaign against the Najahid capital Zabid and were both killed during the siege (1110). Their respective sons ceased to pay tribute to the Sulayhid queen Arwa al-Sulayhi. They were worsted by a Sulayhid expedition but queen Arwa agreed to reduce the tribute by half, to 50,000 dinars per year. The Zurayids again failed to pay and were once again forced to yield to the might of the Sulayhids, but this time the annual tribute from the incomes of Aden was reduced to 25,000. Later on they ceased to pay even that since Sulayhid power was on the wane. After 1110 the Zurayids thus led a more than 60 years long independent rule in the city, bolstered by the international trade. The chronicles mention luxury goods such as textiles, perfume and porcelain, coming from places like North Africa, Egypt, Iraq, Oman, Kirman and China. After the demise of queen Arwa al-Sulayhi in 1138, the Fatimids in Cairo kept a representation in Aden, adding further prestige to the Zurayids.

== The two dynasties ==
The descendants of the brothers Al-Abbās and Al-Msaod lived in severe rivalry with each other. Due to that the constellations of power often shifted. The two lines met in open warfare in 1138. Ali bin Abi Al-Gharat bin Al-Msaod faction was defeated by his kinsman Saba bin Abi Saud and were pushed out of Aden; Ali will later be killed in the battle of Za'za' in Lahij in 1150, displacing them out of Lahij. The victor Saba's sons likewise had a falling-out. But the rivalries also motivated ambitions for expansion.

== Zurayid expansion ==
After the defeat of Al-Msaod branch, The Zurayid sphere of power stretched from Taiz to Dhofar. A decade later the ruler Muhammad bin Saba bought a number of important Sulayhid fortresses and towns & married the last Sulayhid Queen effectively inheriting all Sulayhid possessions. Among them were Dhū Jibla, al-Takar, Ibb and Ḥabb. Muhammad bin Saba died in 1153, and his son and successor Imran in 1166. Both were praised by their contemporary 'Umara as able and amicable rulers. Imran left three small sons. Affairs were henceforth taken care of by the wazir Yāsir bin Bilāl, son of a freedman, who was characterized as brave, virtuous and generous.

== Mahdid & Ayyubid Sunni pressure ==
A new aggressive Sunni dynasty in Zabid, the Mahdids, besieged Aden in 1164. In the face of the acute threat, the Zurayids sought assistance from fellow Hamdanid sultan of San'a. Together the allies were able to utterly defeat the Mahdid ruler Abd an-Nabi in 1173. Immediately after these events, however, an Ayyubid expedition under prince Turan Shah was dispatched against southern Arabia. When the Ayyubids conquered Aden on 22 June 1174 the rule of the Zurayids ended. Yāsir bin Bilāl, who still attended the affairs of the state, fled the city but was betrayed and turned over to Turan Shah who executed him in 1175.

== The End of the Zurayid Dynasty ==
During the first two decades of Ayyubid over-lordship Zurayid influence (remnants of Zurayid-Sulayhid dynasties) surfaced in the highlands enclaves, until it, too, was eventually suppressed in about 1193 with the surrender of the Damloa castle in Al-Hujariah.

== List of rulers ==
Al-Msaod line – Coastal possessions

- Al-Msaod bin Al-Karam Al-Zurayi (1083–1110)
- Abi Al-Gharat bin Al-Msaod (1110–?)
- Muhammad bin Abi Al-Gharat bin Al-Msaod (?–?)
- Ali bin Muhammad bin Abi Al-Gharat bin Al-Msaod (?–1150)

Al-Abbas line – Inland Possessions

- Al-Abbas bin Al-Karam Al-Zurayi (1083–1084)
- Zuray bin Al-Abbas (1084–1110)
- Abi Saud bin Zuray (1110–?)
- Saba bin Abi Saud bin Zuray (?–1138)
- Ali Al-A'azz bin Saba (1138–1139)
- Muhammad bin Saba (1139–1153) (expansion into Central Yemen)
- Imran Muhammad bin Saba (1153–1166)
- Muhammad bin Imran Muhammad bin Saba (1166–1174)
- Abi Saud bin Imran Muhammad bin Saba (1166–1174)

== See also ==
- History of Yemen
- Islamic history of Yemen
- Ismailism
- Batiniyya

== Literature ==
- H.C. Kay, Yaman: Its early medieval history, London 1892, Yaman, its early mediæval history
- Smith, G. Rex (1987). "Politische Geschichte des islamischen Jemen bis zur ersten türkischen Invasion (1 bis 945 Hidschra = 633 bis 1538 n. Chr.)" [Political History of Islamic Yemen until the First Turkish Invasion (1 to 945 AH = 633 to 1538 AD)]. In Daum, Werner (ed.). Jemen. 3000 Jahre Kunst und Kultur des glücklichen Arabien [Yemen. 3000 Years of Art and Civilisation in Arabia Felix]. Innsbruck and Frankfurt a.M.: Pinguin. pp. 136–154. ISBN 3-7016-2251-5.
- G. Rex Smith, The Ayyubids and early Rasulids in the Yemen, Vols. I-II, London: Gibb Memorial Trust 1974-1978.
