= Alam al-Malika =

Medieval slave singer and political advisor in Yemen

Alam al-Malika (Arabic: الملكة علم; died 1130) was the chief adviser and de facto prime minister of the Najahid dynasty of Zubayd in Yemen in 1111–1123, and its ruler in 1123–1130.

She was the slave singer, or jarya, to King Mansur ibn Najah of Zubayd or Zabid (r. 1111–1123), a city principality close to Sanaa in Yemen. He was reportedly so impressed by her intelligence and astuteness that he gave her the title al-hurra, placed her in charge of state affairs and "made no decision concerning it without consulting her". In 1123, Mansur ibn Najah was poisoned by his vizier Mann Allah, but Alam al-Malika remained in charge of the state of Zubayd. Though she was not allowed to have the khutbah proclaimed in her name and thus not given full recognition as monarch, she was the de facto ruler, and it was said of her that "she discharged her task with distinction".
