= Najah =

Najah (Arabic: نجاح najāḥ) is an unisex given name and surname of Arabic origin, meaning "simplicity, relief, ease, clearness" or "victory, triumph, successful". Notable people with this name include:

== Given name ==
- Najah Ali (born 1980), Iraqi boxer
- Najah al-Attar (born 1933), Syrian politician
- Najah Bazzy, American humanitarian and interfaith leader
- Najah Choheili, Iranian Mandaean priest
- Najah Chouaya (born 1988), Tunisian athlete
- Najah Hamadi (born 1984), Tunisian footballer
- Najah Al-Masaeed (born 1977), Emirati poet and media figure
- Najah Salam (1931–2023), Lebanese singer and film actress
- Najah al-Shammari (born 1967), Iraqi politician
- Najah Wakim (born 1946), Lebanese politician
- Najah Rashid (born 2007), Pakistani Filmmaker and Computer Engineer

== Surname ==
- Abderrahim Najah (born 1984), Moroccan basketball player
- Ahmed Najah (born 1947), Moroccan football player
- Anass Najah (born 1997), Moroccan football player
- Imad Najah (born 1991), Moroccan football player
- Sylwia Najah (born 1978), Polish-Tunisian stage and screen actress based in Poland
