= Al-hurra =

Arabic title

Al-Hurra (Arabic: حُرَّة, lit. 'free woman') was an Arabic title historically often given to, or used to refer to, women who exercised power or had a position of power or high status.

In a harem, the title al-hurra was often used to refer to a legal wife of aristocratic birth, to distinguish her status from that of the concubine bought at the slave market, who was referred to as jarya, and used to describe a Muslim aristocratic woman who was "free" in the sense that she was not a slave; it is related to the style Sayyida (Mistress or lady), the feminine word of sayyid (Master or Lord). However, while the title Al-hurra was given to women as an alternative to the titles malika (Queen), Sultana (female sultan) and Sitt, (Lady), there was no exact male equivalent to the title of al-hurra.

The title Al-hurra was often granted to women who wielded political power, but did not necessarily mean they were sovereigns: Alam al-Malika and Sayyida al Hurra, for example, bore this title. Both had political offices; not as sovereigns, but as political adviser and governor respectively.

== Noted title holders ==
- Asma bint Shihab
- Arwa al-Sulayhi
- Alam al-Malika
- Aixa
- Sayyida al Hurra
