= Ali al-Sulayhi =

Sultan of Yemen, Tihamah and Mecca

- Sultan of Yemen, Tihamah and Mecca
- Reign: 1047-1066
- Coronation: 1047
- Predecessor: None
- Successor: Ahmad al-Mukarram
- Born: 966; Manakhah
- Died: 1066 al-Mahjam, Hejaz
- Burial: Sana'a, Yemen
- Spouse: Asma bint Shihab al-Sulayhiyya
- Ali bin Muhammad bin Ali al-Sulayhi
- Dynasty: Sulayhid
- Father: Muhammad al-Sulayhid
- Religion: Ismaili Islam

Ali bin Muhammad bin Ali al-Sulayhi (Arabic: علي بن محمد الصليحي) was the founder and sultan of the Sulayhid dynasty in Yemen. He established his kingdom in 1047 and by 1063, the Sulayhids controlled had unified the entire country of Yemen as well as the Muslim holy city of Mecca under his leadership. Al-Sulayhi was killed in 1066 during a tribal vendetta between the Sulayhids and the Najahids of Zabid. He was succeeded by his son, Ahmad al-Mukarram.

== Early life ==
Al-Sulayhi was born and raised in the village of Jabal near Manakhah. He was the son of Muhammad bin Ali al-Sulayhi, the chief qadi ("judge") of Jabal Haraz. His father was a leading Sunni Muslim and educated al-Sulayhi on the Shafi'i madhab ("school of law.") Nonetheless, al-Sulayhi converted to Ismailism, a branch of Shia Islam, after coming under the influence of the da'i ("missionary") Amir al-Zawahi. Zawahi had kept his Ismaili faith private and was well-regarded by al-Sulayhi's father who employed him to teach his son. However, al-Zawahi, who also served as the Chief Da'i of the Ismailis, secretly taught al-Sulayhi the system of canon law, Da'a'im al-Islam used by the Fatimid Caliphate and the allegorical interpretation of the Qur'an employed by the Ismailis known as ta'wil.

Al-Sulayhi succeeded al-Zawahi as Chief Da'i of Yemen after the latter's death. He married his cousin Asma bint Shihab in the 1030s. She who would later assist him during his reign over the region. Al-Sulayhi kept his religion and his post as Chief Da'i of the Ismailis relatively secret. Starting in 1032, he served as amir al-hajj, leading and protecting the annual hajj ("pilgrimage") caravan to Mecca through Yemen and Asir's rough terrain. He continued in this capacity for 15 years, lecturing groups of pilgrims, including regional Muslim leaders of various ranks, on Ismaili thought on behalf of the Fatimid caliphs. The position, which was a prestigious one among Muslims, also provided al-Sulayhi with a steady and high income.

== Ruler of Yemen ==
Following his marriage to Asma, he moved to Jabal Masur with 60 loyal members of his clan, al-Hajour tribe, part of the Hamdani tribe. After being temporarily besieged by local horsemen, he proceeded to build a large fort at the mountaintop and amassed a huge force of fighters from his tribe and their allies. Raising the banner of his newly founded Sulayhid dynasty at Jabal Masur, he initiated his revolt against the Zaydi rulers of Jabal Haraz in 1047. Consequently, a Zaydi army of 30,000 besieged al-Sulayhi's fortress, but were unsuccessful in breaching it. While the Zaydi army was still positioned at the base of Jabal Masur, al-Sulayhi led a counterattack, killing the opposing generals, dispersing the remaining Zaydi fighters and thereby securing his control over both Masur and Haraz.

Establishing his capital at Sana'a and maintaining his fortress in Masur, al-Sulayhi entered into a prolonged conflict with the Najahids, an Ethiopian ex-slave dynasty based in Zabid. Historian Ibn Khalikan states al-Sulayhi sent a female slave to the Najahid leader Abu Said Najah as a peace offering with the real intent of killing him. In 1060 Najah was poisoned by the slave and died. Al-Sulayhi's forces attacked and captured Zabid and the Tihamah later in 1062.

Also in 1062, Ali sent Lamak ibn Malik to Cairo to serve as an embassy and representative there. His original intention may have been to seek official permission from the Fatimids for Ali's attack on Mecca later that year. Lamak went on to stay in Cairo and represent Sulayhid interests until Ali's death in 1067.

After successfully demanding religious legitimacy from the Fatimid caliph al-Mustansir in 1062, al-Sulayhi shifted Yemen's loyalty to the Cairo-based Ismaili Fatimid Caliphate from the Baghdad-based Sunni Abbasid Caliphate. Thereafter, the Sulayhids served as a vassal for the Fatimids and the names of al-Mustansir, al-Sulayhi and Asma were pronounced in mosques during the khutbah in Friday prayers.

With full-fledged support from the Hamdani and Himyar tribes, al-Sulayhi gradually conquered the rest of Yemen, including Aden, by 1063. Muslim historian Ibn al-Athir stated that once al-Sulayhi obtained Fatimid legitimacy he "embarked on the conquest of the country and toppled the fortresses one after the other with incredible speed." In Aden he had his daughter-in-law Arwa al-Sulayhi collect the annual revenue of 100,000 gold dinars as her dowry. Because of his Shia religion and his descent from the Hamdani tribe which was linked to the era of Sheba he was able to impose his rule over Yemen with popularity and thus relative ease. The only Yemeni principality to challenge his rule throughout his reign was Zabid, still highly influenced by the Najahids.

In late 1063 al-Sulayhi led his forces into the Hejaz and challenged the Abbasids by conquering Mecca by 1064 and installing a client king there. Regarding al-Sulayhi's conquest of Mecca, Ibn al-Athir stated, "He put an end to injustice, reorganized the supply system, and increased the acts of beneficence." Al-Sulayhi brought Mecca firmly into the orbit of Shia Islam and had the name of the Fatimid caliphs pronounced in the khutba.

== Death and aftermath ==
In 1066 al-Sulayhi made the hajj pilgrimage to Mecca with a large caravan that included Asma and the entourage of her court, all of the emirs of the Sulayhid principalities in Yemen, and 5,000 Ethiopian (Abyssinian) soldiers. Al-Sulayhi invited all of his emirs to accompany him in the hajj in safety measure to prevent any revolts against Sulayhid rule while he was away from Yemen. In his absence, he assigned his son Ahmad al-Mukarram to preside over the kingdom. According to Muslim historian Ibn Khaldun, the main reason al-Sulayhi undertook the hajj was because of a command by al-Mustansir to restore Shia order in Mecca after its sharif Muhammad ibn Ja'far, who belonged to the Banu Hashim, disavowed the Fatimid Caliphate.

Al-Sulayhi's caravan was highly luxurious and news of its departing spread throughout Yemen. Sa'id al-Ahwal, the leader of the Najahids and son of their slain former leader, Najah, had prior knowledge of the caravan's planned route and devised an attack on al-Sulaysi to avenge Najah's death. On its way to Mecca, the caravan was assaulted by al-Ahwal's force and al-Sulayhi was killed.

Ibn Khaldun wrote that al-Sulayhi was notified by his brother-in-law As'ad ibn Shihab al-Sulayhi who ruled Zabid that al-Ahwal and his brother Jayyash ibn Najaj had emerged from their hiding and planned to attack the caravan. In response, al-Sulayhi dispatched a force of 5,000 Ethiopian horsemen to protect the caravan and kill the Najahid brothers if they were confronted on the route to Mecca. Jayyash and al-Ahwal successfully evaded notice while pursuing al-Sulayhi and together with a handful of their partisans attacked the caravan while it was encamped outside al-Mahjam. His Ethiopian troops refused to aid him and many of them defected. Afterward, al-Sulayhi, his brother Abdullah al-Sulayhi and 170 males from the Sulayhid family were executed by decapitation. Jayyash was believed to have been responsible for al-Sulayhi's death. Asma and 35 Qahtani princes who ruled Yemen on behalf of al-Sulayhi were captured and stripped of their principalities.

According to Ibn Khalikan, al-Sulayhi and his men were camping outside the farm of al-Dulaim in the Hejaz when al-Ahwal and a handful of his partisans clandestinely entered the camp. Al-Sulayhi's guards mistook them for soldiers, but his brother Abdullah realized they were Najahid men and proclaimed, "To horse! For by Allah here is al-Ahwal and his men of whose coming we were warned yesterday by the letter which As'ad ibn Shihab wrote us from Zabid!" Al-Sulayhi was "seized with terror" and remained in his spot before al-Ahwal killed him. The Najahids proceeded to kill Abdullah and most of al-Sulayhi's family that was present before taking control of the caravan's mostly Ethiopian army.

Yemen's inhabitants were angered and largely saddened by al-Sulayhi's slaughter. Following the latter's death and the execution or imprisonment of his family members and emirs, al-Ahwal enlisted al-Sulayhi's Ethiopian army and with them marched back toward Zabid and successfully wrested control of the former Najahid city. Ibn Shihab escaped to San'a and the severed heads of both al-Sulayhi and Abdullah were affixed to poles outside of Asma's new dwelling in Zabid. Al-Mukarram, who had succeeded al-Sulayhi as sultan, was in a state of disarray until his mother Asma had a letter secretly delivered to him chastising him for his weakness and inciting him to free her. The letter allegedly stated Asma had been impregnated by al-Ahwal and continued, "Come therefore unto me before disgrace light upon me and the whole Arab nation." Asma had deemed bearing al-Ahwal's child to be a shameful act. In 1082, al-Mukkaram led a Sulayhid force against Zabid, quickly capturing the city and Asma, forcing al-Ahwal to flee to the Island of Dahlak and reinstating Ibn Shihab as governor. Al-Sulayhi's head was recovered and then buried.

== Bibliography ==
- Daftari, Farhad (2005), Ismailis in Medieval Muslim Societies, I.B. Tauris, ISBN 1845110919
- Dumper, Michael (2007). Cities of the Middle East and North Africa: A Historical Encyclopedia. ABC-CLIO. ISBN 978-1576079195.
- Ibn Khalikan, Ahmad (1842), Ibn Khallikan's Biographical Dictionary, Printed for the Oriental translation fund of Great Britain and Ireland
- Jackson-Laugher, Guilda (1999), Women Rulers Throughout The Ages: An Illustrated Guide, ABC-CLIO, ISBN 1576070913
- McLaughlin, Daniel (2008), Yemen, Bradt Travel Guides, ISBN 978-1841622125
- Mernissi, Fatima (1997), The Forgotten Queens of Islam, University of Minnesota Press, ISBN 0816624399
- O'Leary, De Lacy (1987), A Short History of the Fatimid Khalifate, A short history of the Fatimid khalifate
- Oliver, Roland (1977), Volume 3 of The Cambridge History of Africa: From C. 1050 to C. 1600, Cambridge University Press, ISBN 0521209811
- Salibi, Kamal Suleiman (1980), A History of Arabia, Caravan Books, ISBN 9780882060361
