= Turan-Shah =

Muslim prince (died 1180)

Shams ad-Din Turanshah
- Al-Malik al-Mu'azzam
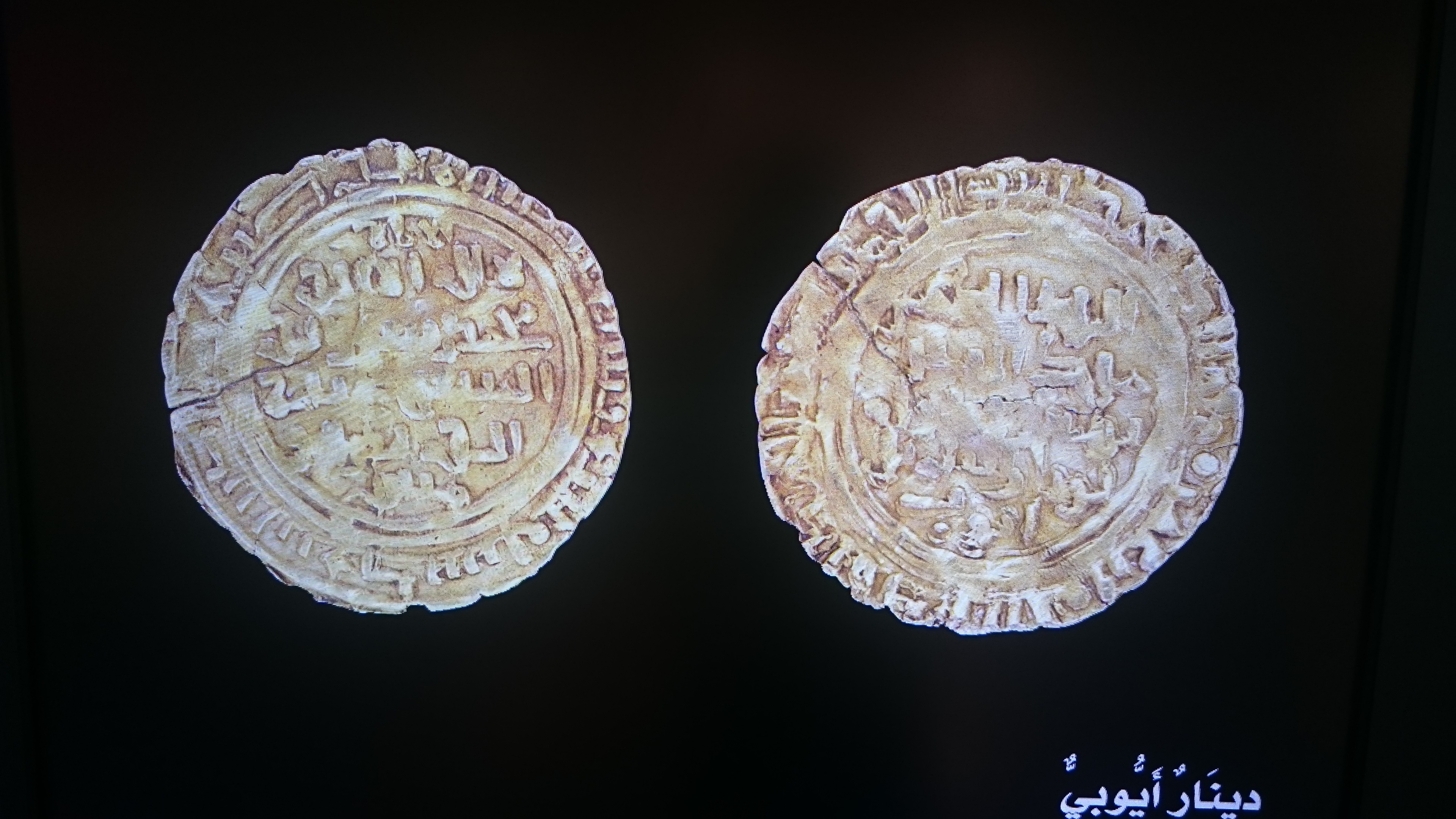
- Turan Shah Dinar Aden

Emir of Alexandria
- Reign: 1180

Emir of Baalbek
- Reign: 1178–1179
- Predecessor: Ibn al-Muqaddam
- Successor: Farrukh Shah

Emir of Yemen
- Reign: 1174–1176
- Predecessor: Emirate established
- Successor: Tughtakin ibn Ayyub
- Died: 27 June 1180; Alexandria, Egypt
- Burial: Damascus, Syria
Names
- Shams ad-Din Turanshah ibn Ayyub al-Malik al-Mu'azzam Shams ad-Dawla Fakhr ad-Din
- Dynasty: Ayyubid
- Father: Najm ad-Din Ayyub
- Religion: Sunni Islam

Shams ad-Din Turanshah ibn Ayyub al-Malik al-Mu'azzam Shams ad-Dawla Fakhr ad-Din known simply as Turanshah (Arabic: توران شاه بن أيوب) (died 27 June 1180) was the Ayyubid emir (prince) of Yemen (1174–1176), Damascus (1176–1179), Baalbek (1178–1179) and finally Alexandria where he died in 1180. He is noted for strengthening the position of his younger brother, Sultan Saladin, in Egypt and playing the leading role in the Ayyubid conquests of both Nubia and Arabia.

== Arrival in Egypt ==
Saladin was vizier to the Fatimid caliph al-Adid. In 1171, Nur al-Din Zengi, the Zengid Sultan of Syria, allowed Turanshah to travel to Egypt to join his brother, at a time of rising tensions between Nur al-Din and Saladin. Nur al-Din empowered Turanshah to supervise Saladin, hoping to provoke dissension between the brothers. However, this attempt failed as Turanshah was immediately granted an immense amount of land by Saladin who was in the process of rebuilding the power structure of the Fatimid state around himself and his relatives. The iqta' or "fief" given to Turanshah comprised the major cities of Qus and Aswan in Upper Egypt as well as the Red Sea port of Aidab. Turanshah was the main force behind the suppression of a revolt staged in 1169 by the Black African garrisons of the Fatimid army. Turanshah attempted to restructure the Egyptian army so that its top positions composed only of ethnic Kurds.

Turanshah developed a close relationship with the poet courtier Umara al-Yamani, who had been a power player in Fatimid politics before Saladin's ascendancy to the vizierate in 1169. On September 11, 1171, the last Fatimid caliph al-Adid died and the Ayyubid dynasty gained official control of Egypt. A number of accusations of murder against Turanshah arose following the caliph's death. According to a eunuch in the service of al-Adid's widow, al-Adid died after hearing that Turanshah was in the palace looking for him. In another version, Turanshah is said to have killed al-Adid himself after the latter refused to reveal the location of state treasures that were hidden in the palace. After the caliph's death, Turanshah settled in Cairo in a quarter formerly occupied by Fatimid emirs.

== Military campaigns ==
=== Campaign against Nubia ===
The Nubians and Egyptians had long been engaged in a series of skirmishes along the border region of the two countries in Upper Egypt. After the Fatimids were deposed, tensions rose as Nubian raids against Egyptian border towns grew bolder ultimately leading to the siege of the valuable city of Aswan by former Black Fatimid soldiers in late 1172-early 1173. The governor of Aswan, Kanz al-Dawla, a former Fatimid loyalist, requested help from Saladin.

Saladin dispatched Turanshah with a force of Kurdish troops to relieve Aswan, but the Nubian soldiers had already departed. Nonetheless, Turanshah conquered the Nubian town of Ibrim and began to conduct a series of raids against the Nubians. His attacks appear to have been highly successful, resulting in the Nubian king based in Dongola, requesting an armistice with Turanshah. Apparently eager for conquest, he was unwilling to accept the offer until his own emissary had visited the King of Nubia and reported that the entire country was poor and not worth occupying. Although the Ayyubids would be forced to take future actions against the Nubians, Turanshah set his sights on more lucrative territories. He managed to acquire considerable wealth in Egypt after his campaign against Nubia, bringing back with him many Nubian and Christian slaves.

=== Conquest of Yemen ===
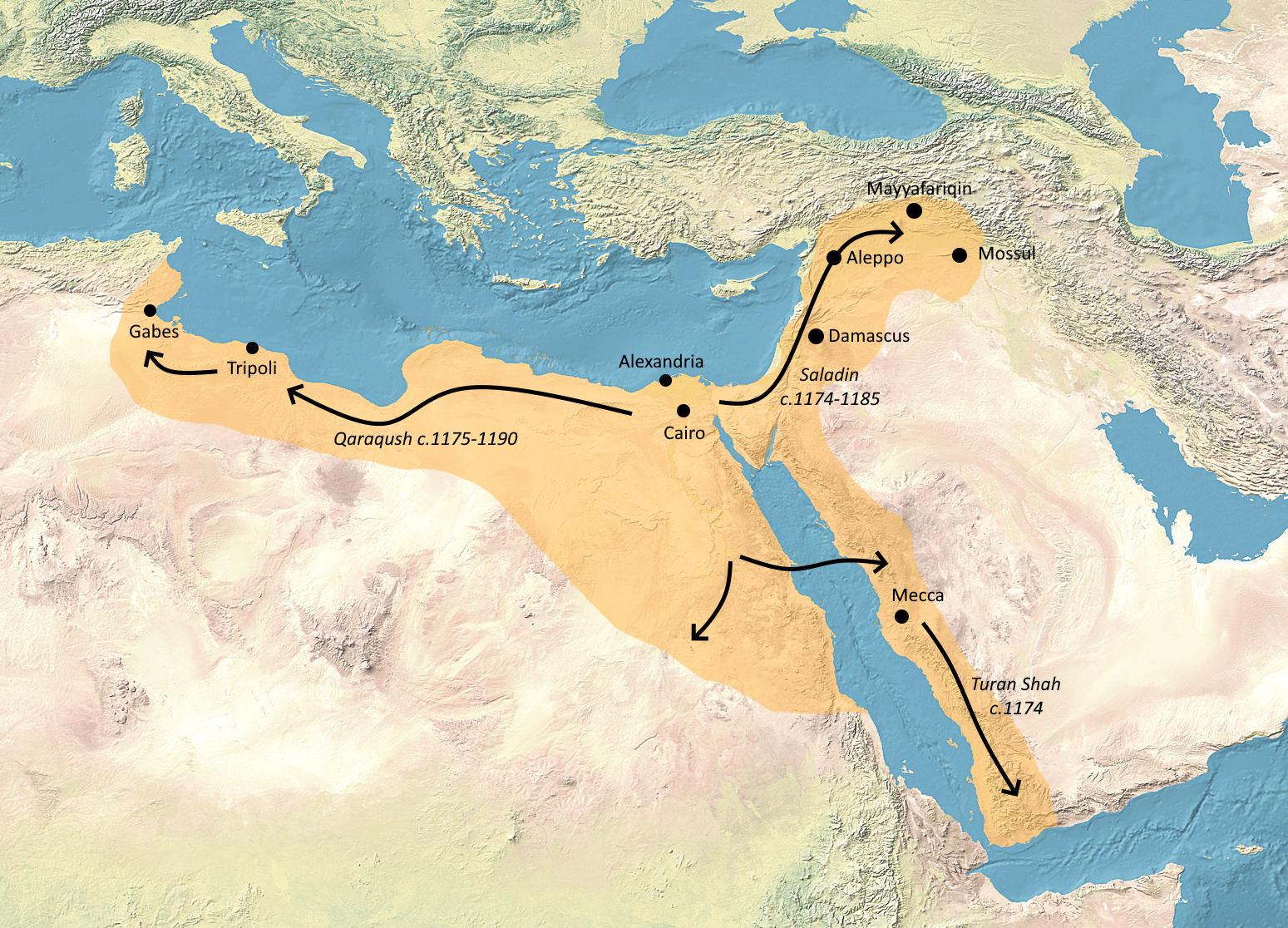
Ayyubid expansion 1174-1193, including the southern expansion of Turan-Shah.

Following his success in Nubia, Turanshah still sought to establish a personal holding for himself while Saladin was facing an ever-increasing amount of pressure from Nur ad-Din who seemed to be attempting invading Egypt. Baha ad-Din ibn Shaddad, Saladin's aide, suggested that there was a heretical leader in Yemen who was claiming to be the messiah, and that this was the principal reason that Saladin dispatched Turanshah to conquer the region. While this is likely, it also appears 'Umara had considerable influence on Turanshah's desire to conquer Yemen and may have been the one who pushed him to gain Saladin's approval to use such a large part of the military forces in Egypt when the showdown with Nur al-Din seemed to be so near. Turanshah's departure from Egypt did not bode well for his adviser, 'Umara, however, as the poet found himself caught up in an alleged conspiracy against Saladin and was executed.

Turanshah set out in 1174 and quickly conquered the town of Zabid in May and the strategic port city of Aden (a crucial link in trade with India, the Middle East, and North Africa) later that year. In 1175, he drove out the Hamdanid sultan, Ali ibn Hatim, from Sana'a after the latter's army was weakened by continuous raids from the Zaidi tribes of Sa'dah. Turanshah then devoted much of his time to securing the whole of southern Yemen and bringing it firmly under the control of the Ayyubids. Although al-Wahid managed to escape Yemen through its northern highlands, Yasir, the head of the Shia Banu Karam tribe that had ruled Aden was arrested and executed on Turanshah's orders. The Mahdid rulers of Zabid shared the same fate. Turanshah's conquest held great significance for Yemen which was previously divided into three states (Sana'a, Zabid, and Aden) and was united by the Ayyubid occupation.

== Transfers of power ==
Although Turanshah had succeeded in acquiring his own territory in Yemen, he had clearly done so at the expense of his power in Cairo. Saladin rewarded him rich estates in Yemen as his personal property. Turanshah did not feel comfortable in Yemen however, and repeatedly asked his brother to transfer him. In 1176, he obtained a transfer to Syria which he governed from Damascus. He also received his father's old fief around Baalbek in 1178. Upon leaving Yemen, the administrator of his estates there was unable to promptly transfer the revenue from his properties to Turanshah. Instead, he left Turanshah behind roughly 200,000 dinars in debt, but this was paid off by Saladin. In 1179, he was transferred to govern Alexandria and died soon after on June 27, 1180. His body was taken by his sister Sitt al-Sham Zumurrud to be buried beside a madrasa built by her in Damascus.

== See also ==
- Nur ad-Din Zangi
- Saladin
- Ayyubid dynasty
- Islamic history of Yemen

== Bibliography ==
- Holt, P.M. The Age of the Crusades: the Near East from the eleventh century to 1517. 1 ed. A History of the Near East. 2, The Age of the Crusades: the Near East from the eleventh century to 1517. P.M. Holt. New York: Longman Group, 1986.
- Izz al-Din Ibn al-Athir. The chronicle of Ibn al-Athir for the crusading period from al-Kamil fi'l-tarikh. Translated by D.S. Richards. Vol. 2, Burlington: Ashgate, 2008.
- Baha al-Din Yusuf ibn Rafi ibn Shaddad. A Rare and Excellent History of Saladin. D.S. Richards. Burlington: Ashgate, 2001.
- Lev, Yaacov (1999). Saladin in Egypt. Leiden, Boston, Köln: Brill. ISBN 90-04-11221-9.
- Mohring, Hannes. Saladin: the Sultan and His Times. Baltimore, Maryland: The Johns Hopkins University Press, 2008.
- Maalouf, Amin. The Crusades Through Arab Eyes. London: Saqi Books, 1984.
- Sobernheim, M. (1987). "Baalbek". In Houtsma, Martijn Theodoor (ed.). E.J. Brill's first encyclopaedia of Islam, 1913–1936, Volume I: A–Bābā Beg. Leiden: BRILL. pp. 543–544. ISBN 90-04-08265-4.
- Strothmann, R. (1987). "Turanshah". In Houtsma, Martijn Theodoor (ed.). E.J. Brill's first encyclopaedia of Islam, 1913–1936, Volume VIII: Ṭa'if–Zūrkhāna. Leiden: BRILL. pp. 884–885. ISBN 90-04-08265-4.
