= Sulayhid dynasty =

11th-12th century Islamic dynasty in Yemen

Sulayhid dynasty بَنُو صُلَيْح (in Arabic)
- 1047–1138
- Capital: Sana'a; Jibla
- Common languages: Arabic
- Religion: Ismaili Shia Islam
- Government: Sultanate
- Sultan
  - 1047–1066 (first): Ali al-Sulayhi
  - 1067/1081–1086: Al-Mukarram Ahmad
  - 1086–1138: Arwa al-Sulayhi
- Historical era: Early Middle Ages
  - Established: 1047
  - Disestablished: 1138
- Currency: Dinar
Preceded by
Najahids
Rassids
Succeeded by
Zurayids
Hamdanids (Yemen)
Najahids
Sulaymanids

The Sulayhid dynasty (Arabic: بَنُو صُلَيْح, romanized: Banū Ṣulayḥ, lit. 'Children of Sulayh') was an Ismaili Shi'ite Arab dynasty established in 1047 by Ali ibn Muhammad al-Sulayhi that ruled most of historical Yemen at its peak. The Sulayhids brought to Yemen peace and a prosperity unknown since Himyaritic times. The regime was confederate with the Cairo-based Fatimid Caliphate, and was a constant enemy of the Rassids - the Zaidi Shi'ite rulers of Yemen throughout its existence. The dynasty ended with Arwa al-Sulayhi affiliating to the Taiyabi Ismaili sect, as opposed to the Hafizi Ismaili sect that the other Ismaili dynasties such as the Zurayids and the Hamdanids adhered to.

== Origins ==
The Sulayhids are from the Arab Yemeni clan of Banu Salouh, descended from the al-Hajour tribe, descended from the Hashid tribe, descended from the Hamdanids.

== Rise ==
The first Isma'ili missionaries, Ibn Hawshab and Ali ibn al-Fadl al-Jayshani, already appeared in Yemen in 881, thirty years before the establishment of the Fatimid Caliphate. Their creed was subsequently disseminated among the mountain tribes in the early 10th century. During this period Ibn al-Fadl managed to conquer San'a and the central highlands in 905, while Ibn Hawshab established himself at Shibam Kawkaban. Nevertheless, this regime was beaten by the resurgent indigenous Yu'firid dynasty in 916, after Ibn al-Fadl's death in 915.

In spite of this setback the mission of the Fatimids continued. The Fatimid da'i (leader) in Yemen, Sulayman az-Zawahi, befriended a young man from the mountainous region Haraz to the south-west of San'a, Ali bin Muhammad as-Sulayhi (d. 1067 or possibly 1081). Ali was the son of a respected Sunni chief but nevertheless susceptible to the doctrines and decrees of the Fatimids. In 1046, Ali was eventually converted to the Ismaili creed and was appointed khalifa within the da'wa (dissemination of the creed). In 1047 he gathered an armed force in Haraz and thus founded the Sulayhid dynasty (1047–1138). In the following years his regime managed to subdue all of Yemen. The ruler of the Najahids in the Tihaman lowland was poisoned in 1060 and his capital Zabid was taken by the Sulayhids. The first Sulayhid ruler conquered the whole of Yemen in 1062, and proceeded northwards to occupy the Hejaz. For a time, the Sulayhids appointed the Emirs of Mecca. Ali also controlled San'a since 1063, after bringing fighting against the Zaidiyyah to a successful conclusion. San'a was made the capital of his kingdom. The Ma'nids of Aden were defeated in 1062 and forced to pay tribute. Ali as-Sulayhi appointed governors in Tihama, al-Janad (close to Ta'izz) and at-Ta'kar (close to Ibb).

== Al-Mukarram Ahmad ==
Ali as-Sulayhi was assassinated at the hands of relatives of the Najahids whom he had previously defeated; the date is variously given as 1067 or 1081. He was succeeded on the throne by his son al-Mukarram Ahmad. The beginning of his rule is not satisfactory documented, but the area controlled by the Sulayhids was severely diminished, possibly to the San'a area. After some years, al-Mukarram Ahmad was able to rescue his mother Asma bint Shihab who had been captured by the Najahids, and the Sulayhid armies regained much territory. He could certainly not prevent the Najahids from keeping outside his power in the Tihamah, but the Sulayhids nevertheless remained the most powerful regime in Yemen.

In Aden the Zurayids, another Ismaili dynasty, came to power in 1083, at first as Sulayhid tributaries. The reign of al-Mukarram Ahmad ended in 1086 when he turned over governance to his wife Arwa. He may nevertheless have exerted some influence from behind during the next few years. He died in the fortress of Ashyah in 1091.

== Queen Arwa ==
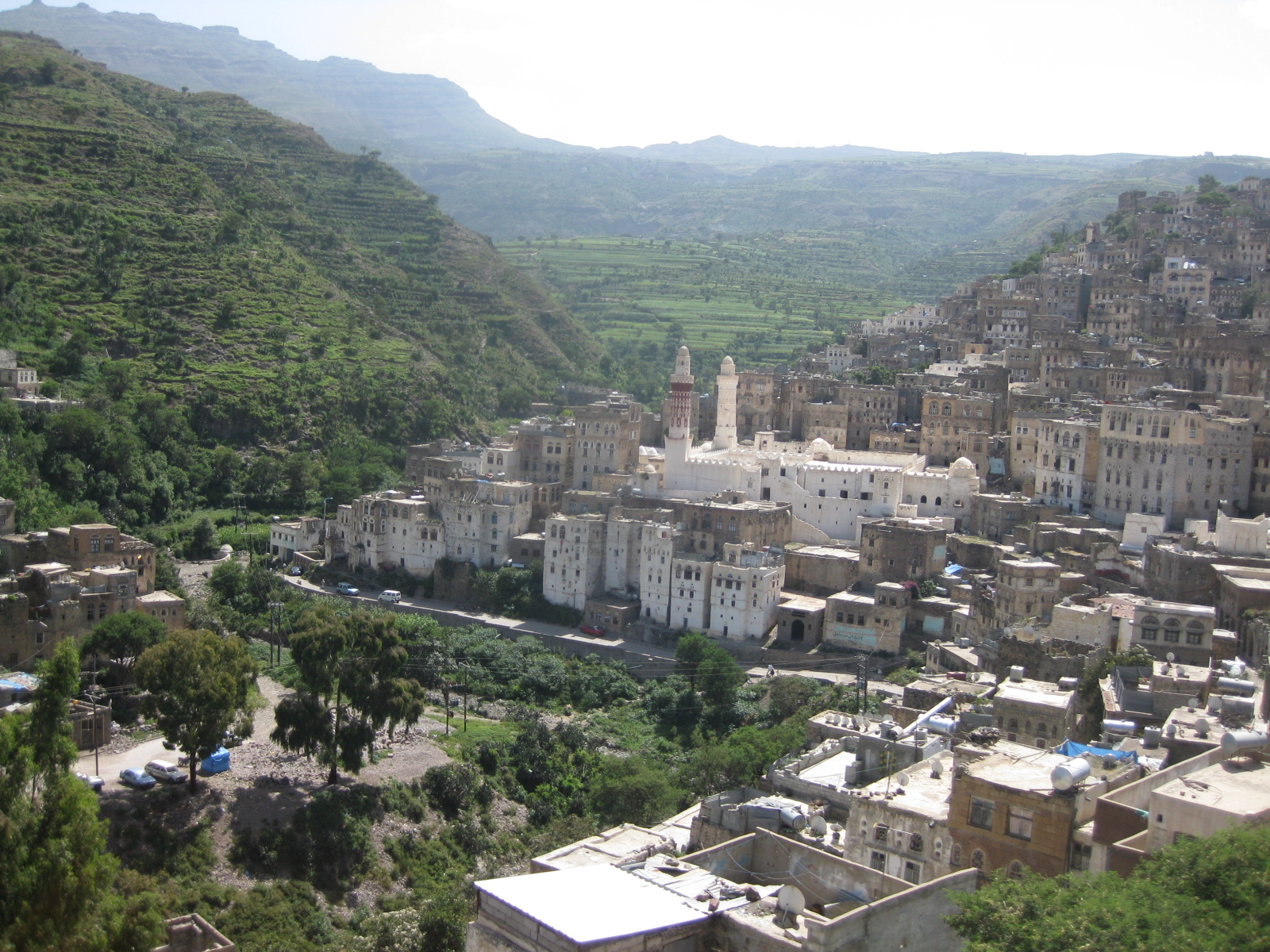
The Queen Arwa Mosque in Jibla, amid the Sarat Mountains of Yemen

Arwa al-Sulayhi (r. 1086–1138) had borne al-Mukarram Ahmad four children, but none of these took an active part in politics. The new queen was recognized by the Fatimids of Egypt as the suzerain over the various Yemeni kings. She established her capital in Jibla rather than Sana'a in about 1087. Queen Arwa was known as an outstanding ruler, indeed one of the most renowned ruling queens of the Islamic world. She governed with the help of a succession of strong henchmen. The first was Saba' bin Ahmad, a distant cousin of the Sulayhids who formally married queen Arwa. The marriage, however, was probably not consummated. He fought vigorously against the Najahids in the lowland and died in 1098. After his demise San'a was lost to the Sulayhids. The second was Al-Mufaddal bin Abi'l-Barakat (d. 1111) who governed from at-Ta'kar, a massive mountain fortress south of the capital Jibla, and was likewise active in the field against the Najahids. The third was Ibn Najib ad-Dawla who arrived in Yemen in 1119 from Egypt, being dispatched by the Fatimid caliph there. He managed to pacify much of southern Yemen and push back the Najahids. As he saw the queen too old to rule over the territories, Ibn Najib attempted a coup in 1125. However, he was bested and sent back to Egypt in a wooden cage, and died on the way. The last years of queen Arwa's reign are ill-documented. With her death in 1138, there was no-one left of the dynasty, and the Sulayhid era came to an end.

== Rulers ==
- Ali al-Sulayhi (1047–1067 or 1081)
  - Asma bint Shihab, co-ruler
- Al-Mukarram Ahmad (1067 or 1081–1086)
- Arwa bint Ahmad (1086–1138)
  - Abd al-Mustansir, co-ruler
  - Saba' al-Sulayhi, co-ruler

== See also ==
- List of Shia Muslim dynasties
- History of Yemen
- Islamic history of Yemen
