= Al-Ranad Fort =

Coordinates: 16.054881°N 48.996317°E

- حصن الرناد
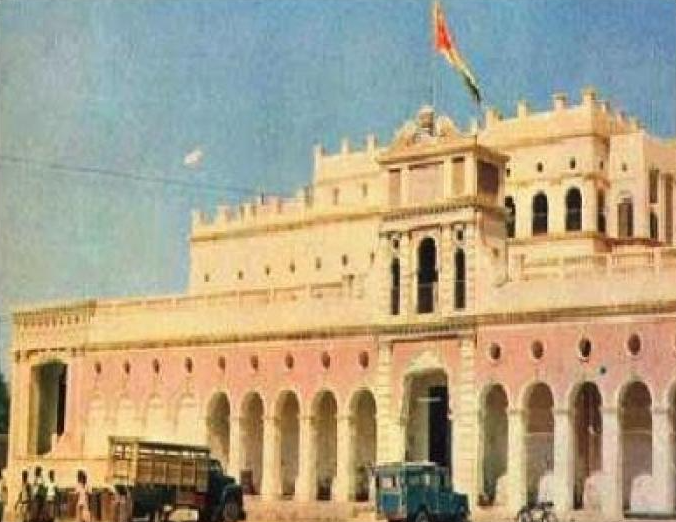
- The entrance of the fort
- Interactive map of Al-Ranad Fort
- Alternative names: People's palace

General information
- Location: Tarim, Hadhramaut Governorate, Yemen
- Year built: 225 CE

Al-Ranad Fort (Arabic: حصن الرَناد) is a mudbrick palace in the city of Tarim in Yemen. It is considered to be one of the most prominent historical mudbrick buildings in South Arabia. The palace is notable for its size and architectural style, as it consists of six floors and combines Hadrami, Greek, and Southeast Asian building styles. The palace has been a local symbol of power and rule since ancient times. It was built before Islam, the people of Tarim continued to decorate and restore it throughout the past centuries. It used to be the center of local governance in the city. Recently, it was restored by the Yemeni Ministry of Culture in 2010 to become a cultural landmark.
