= Architecture of Yemen =

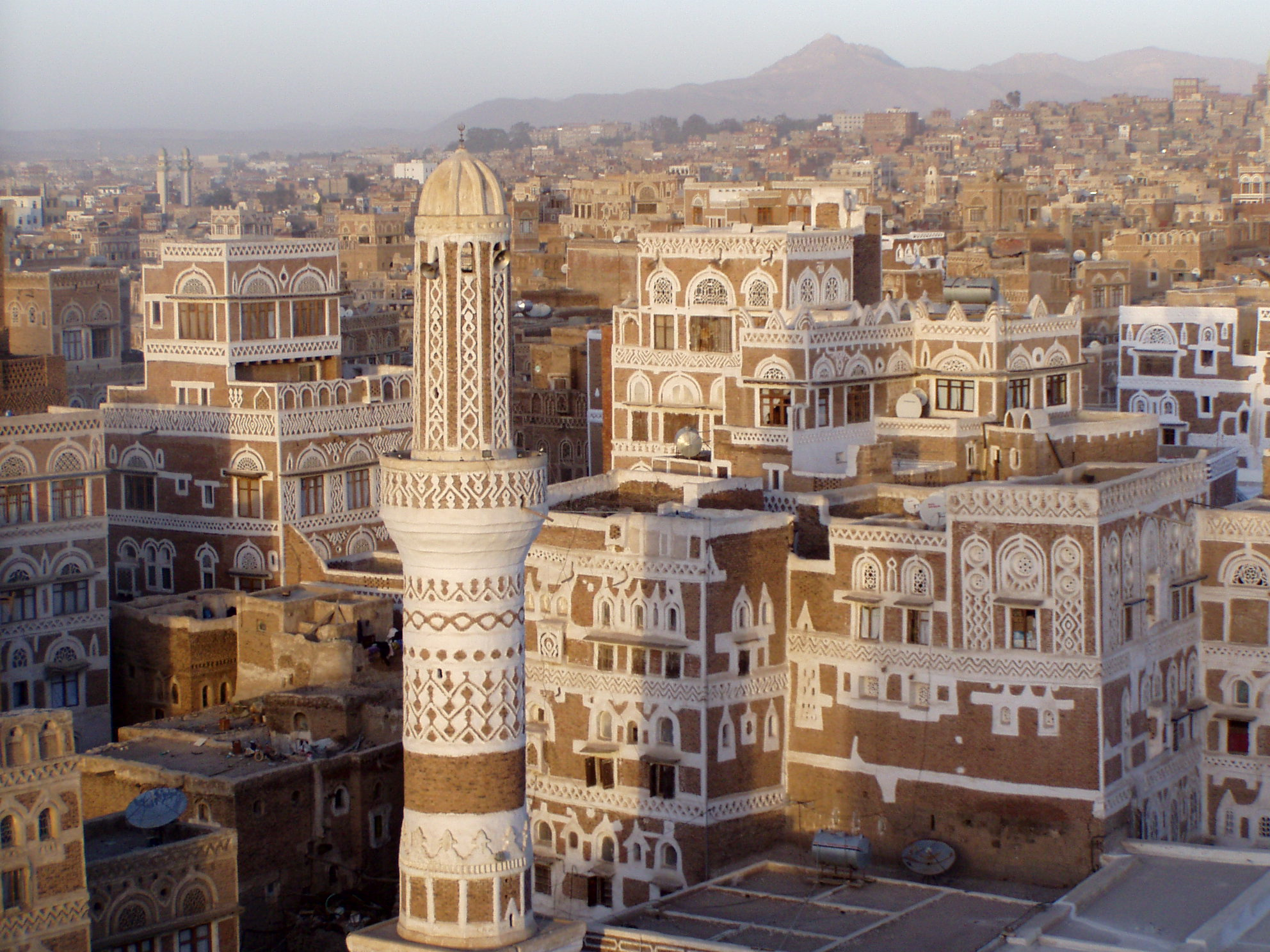
Historic cityscape of the Old City of Sanaa, a UNESCO World Heritage Site

The architecture of Yemen dates back to ancient times, when it was part of a tradition of South Arabian architecture. Developments continued during the Islamic period, displaying both local characteristics and external influences. The historic cities and towns of Yemen are known for their traditional tower-houses.

== Ancient Yemen ==
In Antiquity, Yemen was home to several wealthy city-states and an indigenous tradition of South Arabian architecture. Historical texts and archeological evidence indicate that large and richly decorated palaces existed in several cities, such as the Ghumdan Palace in Sanaa. Most of these structures have not been preserved, although the remains of Shabwa, the former capital of Ḥaḍramawt, provide some evidence of their structure.

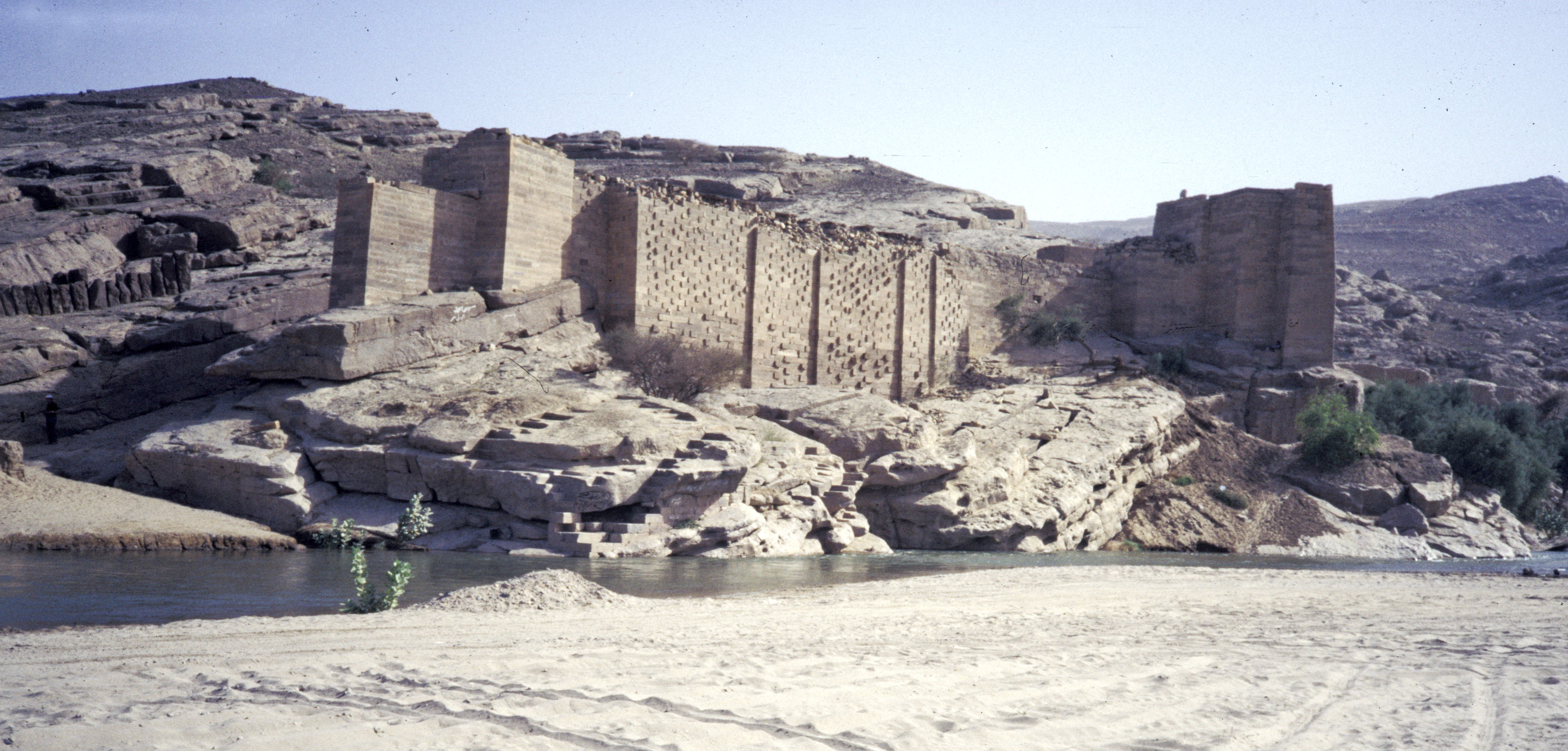
Remains of the ancient Marib Dam in 1988

In the first millennium BCE, the first large South Arabian kingdom, Saba', was created by the Sabaeans with its center at Marib, alongside other kingdoms in the region. Its influence reached as far as Ethiopia. The oases of this region grew their agriculture with the help of floodwaters. Marib city and some constructions in the Wadi Dhana valley were likely established as early as the 2nd millennium BCE and artificial irrigation may date as far back as the third millennium BCE. The ancient Marib Dam was first built in the 6th century BCE and repaired up until the 5th or 6th century CE. It was a major feat of engineering in the ancient world and was used to harness the water of biannual floods, allowing for more systematic irrigation. The first dam was a basic earth-built structure around 580 meters (1,900 feet) long and probably about 4 meters (13 feet) high, situated between two rock formations. A second dam was built towards 500 BC as a sloping rampart with a triangular cross section. It stood about 7 meters (23 feet) high and was faced with stone and mortar. The next major reconstruction was undertaken by the Himyarites in or after the late 2nd century CE, who rebuilt it as another earthen structure faced with stone, this time 720 meters (2,360 feet) long, 14 meters (46 feet) high, and complete with more sophisticated hydraulic systems.

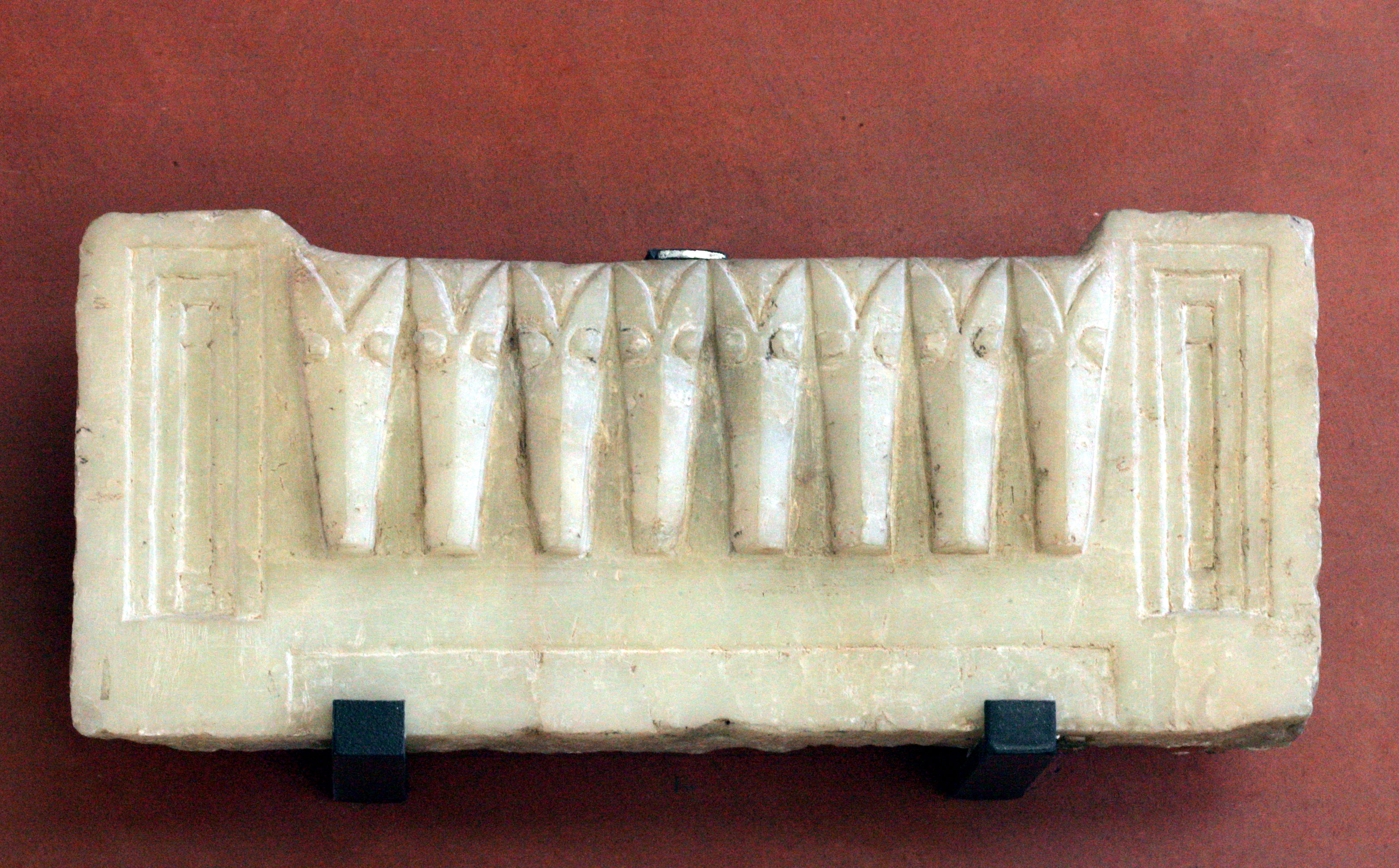
Decorative frieze of stylized ibex heads from the Sabaean period in Yemen, on display at the Louvre

Classical Sabaean temples were structures with an inner courtyard in peristyle form (surrounded by porticoes). An example of this is the Awwam Temple or Mahram Bilqis, which was erected at the edge of a large, roughly oval, walled enclosure. Some temples in the Jawf region had a hypostyle form. In both the Jawf and Hadramawt regions, there were also temples consisting of an interior space divided by two rows of three or four pillars, which in Hadramawt often had bent entrances. The art of these temples is characterized by their abstractness, as exemplified by their distinctive ibex friezes. Aside from temple architecture, it also appears that the traditional Yemeni tower-house emerged around this period, built with stone foundations and upper sections in wood and clay.

In the first century BCE, the Romans arrived in the Red Sea region, resulting in a shift in power and trade networks. A new Himyarite kingdom took control of Yemen. In the same century, the Palace of Shaqir (the "Towering One") was built in Shabwa. It was destroyed circa 230 CE but subsequently rebuilt and restored. The building, made of mudbrick and wood on stone foundations, consisted of a towering multi-story structure attached to a courtyard surrounded by two-story galleries. The galleries had octagonal pillars covered with carved vine motifs and capitals carved with images of griffins. Wall frescoes depicted scenes with women and other decorative motifs. The ornamental repertoire displays links with late Hellenistic art of the time.

As the Himyarite kingdom grew stronger, it cultivated a period of peace and cultural exchanges. The capital was at Zafar (near Yarim), which was enclosed by double walls and nine gates. It had a citadel, the Raidan fortress or Raydan Palace, which was the seat of the Himyarite kings. Other stone castles were built in various locations. By the 5th century AD, there is evidence that the indigenous styles were being influenced by Byzantine and Late Antique Mediterranean art. In the 5th and 6th centuries, Christianity spread in the region and churches were built. Abraha, a local Aksumite ruler who made Sanaa his capital, built a cathedral there circa 567, allegedly with the help of two architects provided by Byzantine emperor Justinian I. The Ghumdan Palace, which was probably first built around 200 CE, was preserved in collective memory and probably influenced the architecture of future palaces. It apparently had many stories, a transparent roof of alabaster, coloured stone inlay decorating its façades, and animal statues.

== Islamic period ==
=== 7th to 13th centuries ===
Yemen was Islamized in the 7th century, but few buildings from the early Islamic period have been preserved intact today. It is only from the 10th century onward that distinctive Islamic architectural styles can be documented. Yemeni architecture can be characterized as "conservative", as the Yemeni people combine their pre-Islamic and Islamic past. This philosophy is demonstrated in the construction of the Mosque of Sulayman ibn Dawud in Marib, which was built directly on top of an old temple.

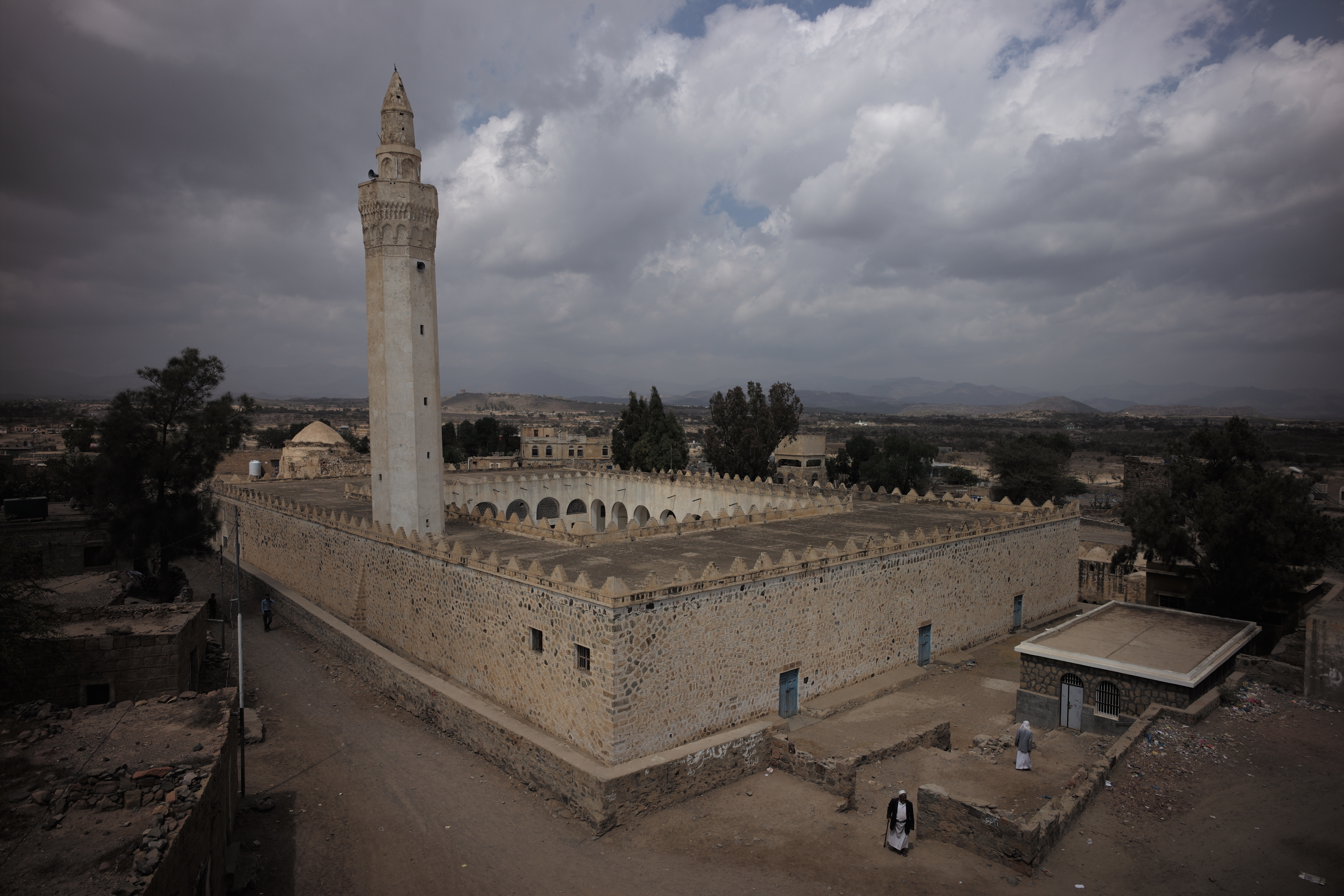
The Great Mosque of Janad was founded in 627–8 but rebuilt in later centuries (2014 photo)

The oldest mosque in Yemen is believed to be either the Great Mosque of Janad (located in Janad, northeast of Taiz) or the Great Mosque of Sanaa. The mosque in Janad was reportedly founded in 627–8 (6 AH) by Mu'adh ibn Jabal. Traditional Muslim sources claim the Great Mosque of Sanaa was originally built on the orders of Muhammad, carried out by one of his companions. A study by 'Abd al-Muhsin al-Mad'aj suggests that it was most likely built in 633.

After the early caliphal period, the region was ruled by various dynasties including the Sulayhids (11th–12th centuries). One type of mosque attested around this time consists of a large cubic chamber with one entrance, which had antecedents in the pre-Islamic temple architecture of the region. Examples include the al-Abbas Mosque in Asnaf (1126, near Sanaa) and the Mosque of Sarha (13th century, near Ibb), which both have richly decorated ceilings carved and painted with interlacing star-like patterns. Another type consisted of a rectangular chamber, with a transverse orientation, with multiple entrances and supporting columns inside, sometimes preceded by a courtyard. Examples of this include the Mosque of Sulayman ibn Dawud (1089, reusing ancient remains) at Marib and the congregational mosque of Damar (12th–13th century). This type also had pre-Islamic antecedents.

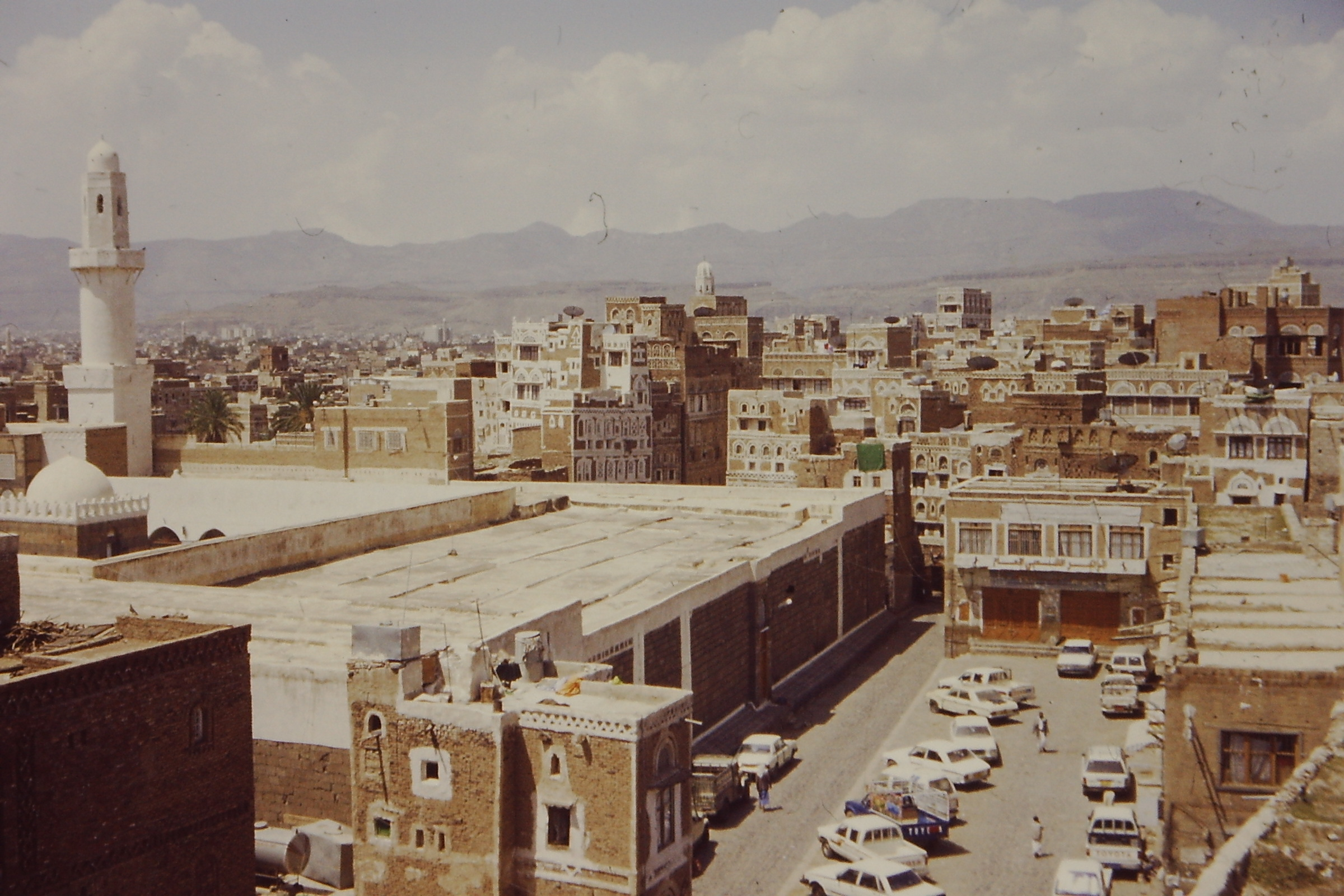
The Great Mosque of Sanaa (left) is an early example of the hypostyle courtyard mosque in Yemen. Founded in the 7th century, it was rebuilt and expanded into its current form in later centuries.

The hypostyle mosque with courtyard, which was more common throughout much of the Islamic world at the time, was comparatively rare in early Islamic Yemen. The Great Mosque of Sanaa was one of the few mosques of this type in the region. After its foundation, it was rebuilt in larger form on the orders of the Umayyad caliph al-Walid (r. 705–715). It was reconstructed again in 753–4 and after 875. On the latter occasion it was rebuilt with stone and gypsum walls and a teak roof, though these too have been repaired and restored over the centuries. The mosque's decoration reflects the multiple restorations but also exemplifies the best artistic techniques in Yemen over the centuries, including carved and painted wood, carved stone, and carved stucco. The earliest known example of a monumental entrance portal in Yemen was also added to the Great Mosque of Sanaa at an entrance along the qibla wall in 1158.

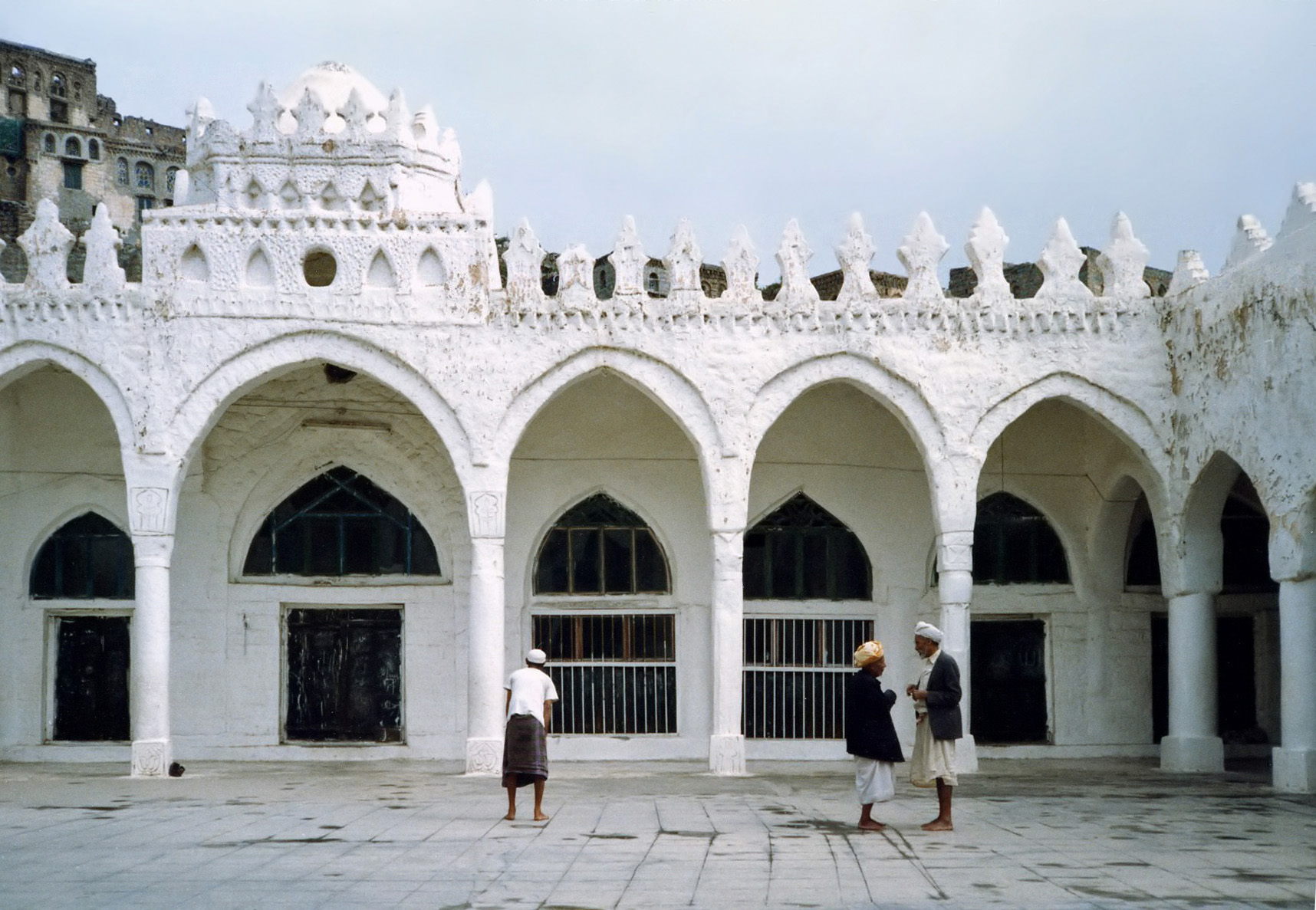
Courtyard inside the Mosque of Arwa bint Ahmad in Jibla (11th century)

Other examples of early hypostyle courtyard mosques in the region are the Great Mosque of Shibam Kawkaban (9th–10th century) and the Mosque of Arwa bint Ahmad (1087–9) in Jibla. The Great Mosque of Janad also has a courtyard form, but it was rebuilt in its present form circa 1200, and it is unclear what its original layout would have been. The Great Mosque of Shibam, like the Great Mosque of Sanaa, has a richly painted ceiling, though its columns and their capitals resemble pre-Islamic forms. The Mosque of Arwa bint Ahmad was reportedly part of a Sulayhid palace before being converted to a mosque. Unlike other local hypostyle mosques at the time, it features a dome over the space in front of its mihrab, which is likely due to Fatimid architectural influence via the Sulayhids (who acknowledged the Fatimids as caliphs). Its mihrab is the oldest surviving well-decorated mihrab in Yemen, covered in carved arabesques and featuring a rectangular frame with a Kufic inscription. This design was imitated in later mihrabs in the region.

For many centuries, one of the most important cities in the region was Zabid, which was the capital under several successive dynasties, starting with the Ziyadids (9th to 11th centuries). It has the highest concentration of historic religious buildings of any city in Yemen aside from Sanaa. Two of the most important mosques are the Great Mosque of Zabid and the al-Asha'ir Mosque, both hypostyle courtyard mosques built by the Ziyadid ruler al-Husayn ibn Salamah (r. 983–1012). The brick minaret of the Great Mosque of Zabid is one of the oldest surviving minarets in Yemen, though it was added later under the Ayyubids (c. 1200).

=== 13th century and after ===
==== Mosques and madrasas ====
The Ayyubids introduced domed mosque types as well as Sunni-style madrasas to the region, but none of their buildings in Yemen have survived. However, the Rasulids after them (13th–15th centuries) were prolific patrons of architecture and perpetuated these new building types, influenced by their political links with Egypt. The Rasulids were based in Taiz and several of their buildings survive there, including the Muẓaffariyya Mosque (built by Sultan al-Malik al-Muẓaffar Yusuf sometime between 1249 and 1295) and several madrasas that also incorporate mosques.

The domed mosque type was a significant innovation in the history of religious architecture in Yemen and demonstrates a greater integration of architectural ideas from the surrounding Islamic world. One of its earliest examples was the Mosque of al-Mahjam. Its minaret, which is very similar to that of the Great Mosque of Zabid, is all that remains of the mosque, but records indicate that its prayer hall had many domes. While Ayyubid structures in Yemen have not survived, it's possible that some of them served as prototypes for later domed mosques in the region. Art historian Barbara Finster also suggests that the Asadiyya Madrasa in Ibb, built in the first half of the 13th century, may have been the model for later domed mosques, as it has a prayer hall consisting of a central dome flanked by pairs of domes on either side.

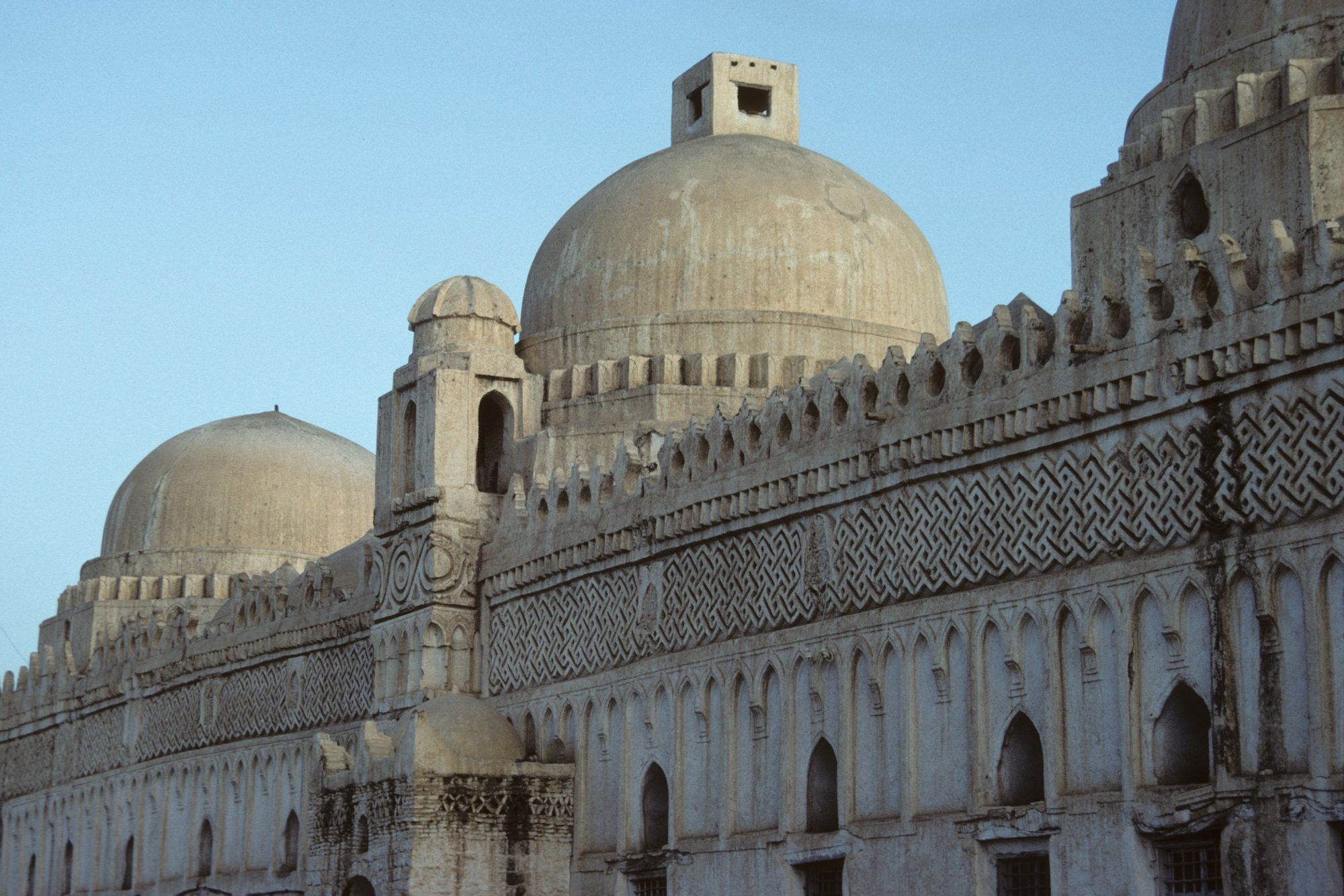
Northern (qibla) façade of the Muẓaffariyya Mosque in Taiz (second half of 13th century)

Most of the Rasulid religious buildings were characterized by a domed prayer hall that is wider than it is deep. This layout was also continued in the architecture of the Tahirids who succeeded the Rasulids in the 15th century. Aside from the major dynastic constructions, similar but smaller domed mosques appeared throughout the areas occupied by a Sunni population. This transversal domed layout thus distinguished Sunni sanctuaries from those built in areas controlled by the contemporary Zaydi imams, who were Shi'a. This floor plan is exemplified by the Muẓaffariyya Mosque, which has a large central dome flanked by two consecutive pairs of smaller domes to the west and three to the east, each of these leading to another large domed chamber at the western and eastern ends of the hall. The design of this mosque was innovative in its inclusion of large windows in the qibla wall, thus introducing much more light to the interior than in more traditional mosque designs. The exterior façade of the qibla wall is also decorated with friezes of interlacing motifs.

The oldest madrasas in Yemen also date from the Rasulid period, including the aforementioned Asadiyya Madrasa (before 1258), the Mu'tabiyya Madrasa in Taiz (1392), and the Ashrafiyya Madrasa (built by Sultan al-Malik al-Ashraf in 1397–1401) also in Taiz. Unlike contemporary madrasas in Egypt, the Rasulid madrasas do not follow the four-iwan layout. The Mu'tabiyya and Ashrafiyya madrasas both have rectangular floor plans with a domed prayer hall to the north and a courtyard to the south flanked by smaller domed and vaulted chambers on either side which were used for teaching.

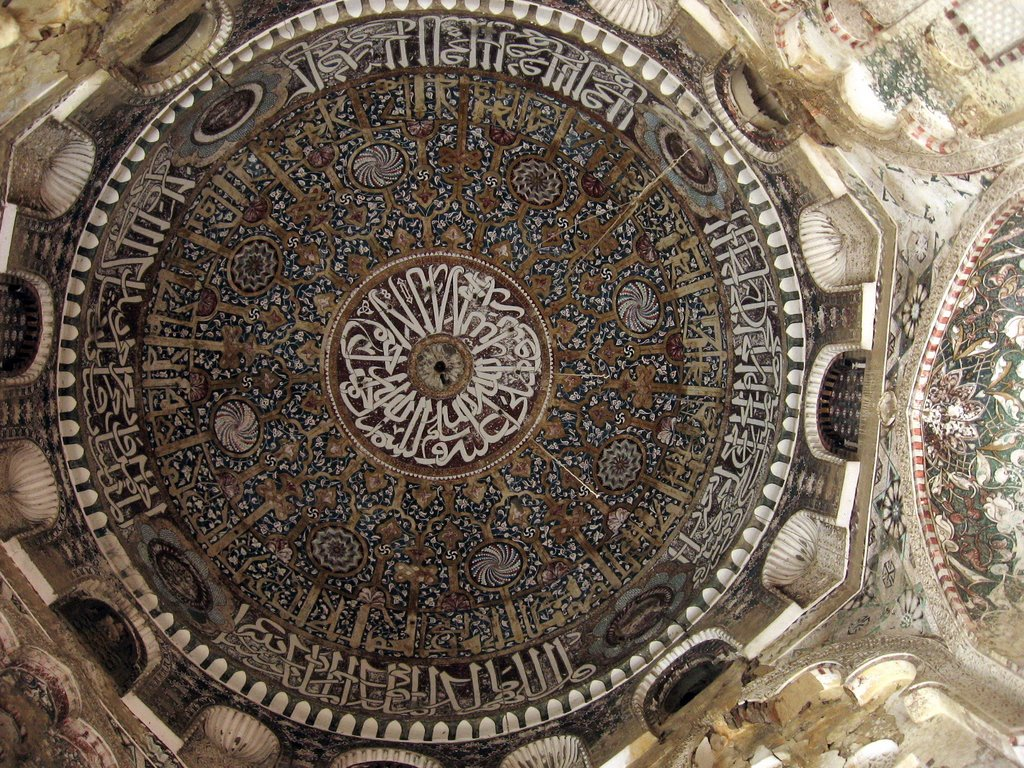
Central dome of the Ashrafiyya Mosque in Taiz, c. 1397

Barbara Finster considers the Mu'tabiyya to be a high point of Yemeni architecture thanks to its meticulous and deliberate planning. It has a prayer hall of six equal domed bays which is surrounded by a U-shaped passage to the west, south, and east. The west and east wings of this passage are open to the outside via an arcade and terminate with small domed chambers at their north ends. On the south side of it is a rectangular courtyard flanked by teaching rooms to the east and west, with the projecting entrance gate and its vestibule located south of the courtyard. The slightly later Ashrafiyya represents essentially a larger-scale version of the same design, further distinguished by imposing twin minarets near its southern corners. It also has an entrance portal built with stones of different colour carved with scallopped motifs and a multifoil arch, a style most likely borrowed from Upper Mesopotomia. Most of the many small madrasas across Yemen simply imitated the traditional design of local mosques while adding an additional lecture hall across the courtyard from the prayer hall. An example that features exceptionally rich stucco decoration on the courtyard façades is the Farhaniyya Madrasa in Zabid (before 1432).

The mosques built under the early Zaydi imams include the Mosque of Zafar Dhibin (c. 1200) and the Mosque of al-Hadi (1339–40) in Saada. The Mosque of Zafar Dhibin, which was part of a palace complex, looks superficially like a courtyard mosque but its courtyard lacks a covered gallery (riwaq) on the south side and it is dominated by two attached tombs. The tomb of Imam al-Mansur Billah sits opposite the prayer hall on the same axis as the mosque's mihrab. The prayer hall's courtyard façade is decorated with carved stucco highlighted with gray-green faience tiles and an arcade of mixtilinear or trefoil-like arches that could reflect a distant Maghebi influence via Egypt. Inside, the prayer hall has richly decorated coffered ceilings and its three central naves leading towards the mihrab are taller than the others. This rich and particular decorative is program is not known in other courtyard-type mosques in Yemen. The al-Hadi Mosque has two parts, one of which has a wide but shallow courtyard with a prayer hall to the north and a series of tombs around the other sides, similar in conception to the Zafar Dhibin Mosque. The second part is a larger extension to the north, which includes a rectangular courtyard with a freestanding minaret inside it. The prayer hall has both longitudinal and transversal rows of arches (i.e. running perpendicular and parallel to the qibla wall. Unlike the Zafar Dhibin Mosque, decoration is absent in most of the hall except for the domed bay in front of the mihrab.

Minarets in the later Rasulid period were strongly influenced by Egyptian Mamluk minarets, with shafts divided into multiple levels with differing designs. The minarets built under the early Zaydi imams were generally simpler, with a mostly smooth circular shaft set on a square base.

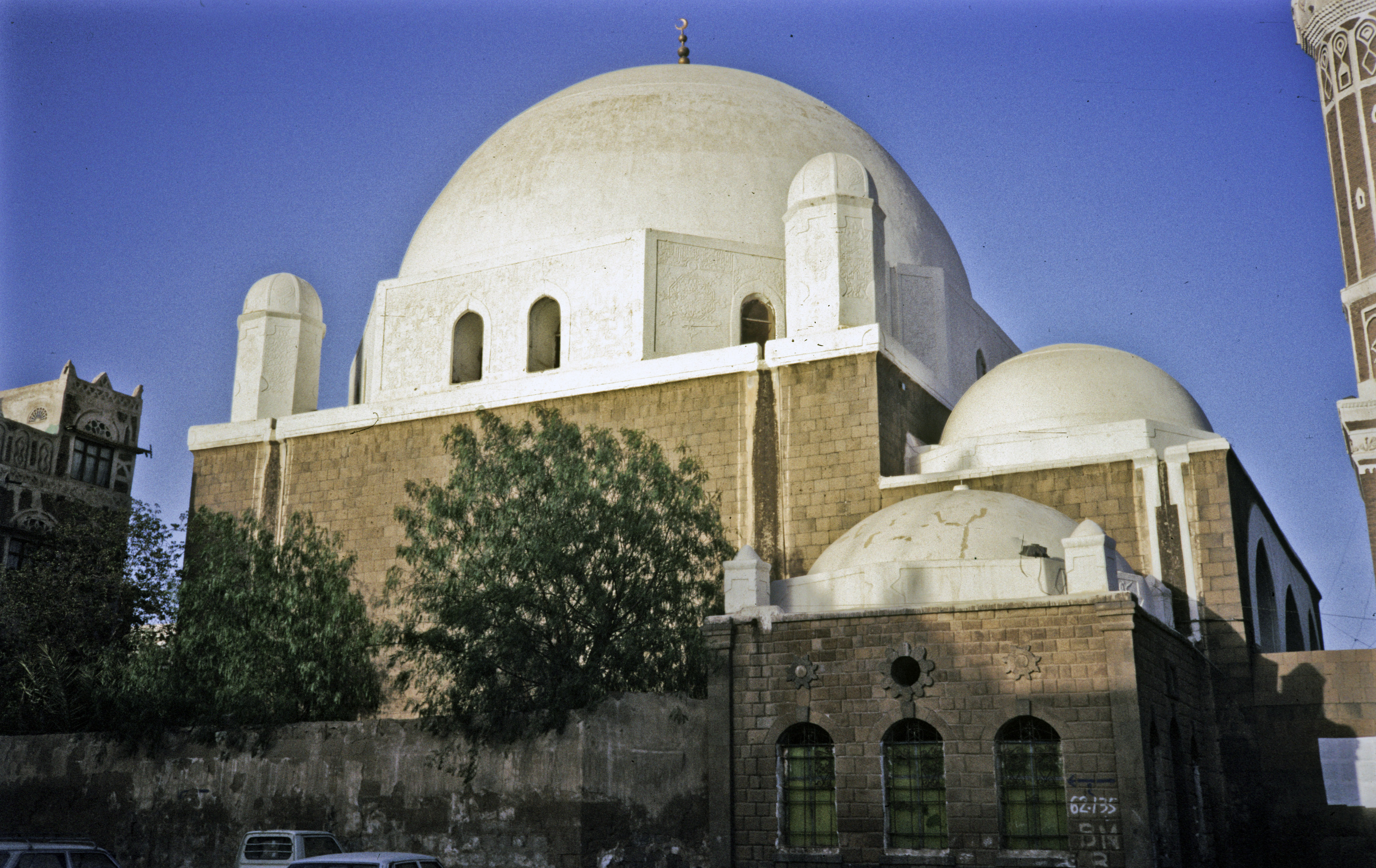
The Bakiriyya Mosque in Sanaa (1597) demonstrates the influence of the domed Ottoman style

With the advent of Ottoman rule in Yemen from 1538 to 1636, Rasulid-style architecture continued to be the local norm in Sunni-controlled areas, but elements of Ottoman architecture began to be introduced in the late 16th century. The clearest monument of Ottoman inspiration is the Bakiriyya Mosque in Sanaa from 1597, which has a large dome and four corner turrets, but this design does not seem to have inspired later buildings.

==== Tombs ====
In this same period, Zaydi imams in northern Yemen were buried in richly decorated domed tombs which were among the only significant examples of this type of building in Yemen at the time. The tombs at Zafar Dhibin are one of the earliest examples of prominent Zaydi tombs, dating to the early 13th century. Another major complex of Zaydi domed tombs, dating generally from the 14th and 15th centuries, is the one attached to the Mosque of al-Hadi in Saada. The domed structures have been built up next to each other and are now interconnected. They were usually open on three sides, with a mihrab on the qibla side, and covered by either simple domes or more ornate gadrooned domes. The interiors are very richly decorated with inscription bands and carved stucco, in contrast with the mostly plain mosque. A more expansive but exceptional layout is found in the tomb of Imam Salah ad-Din (d. 1391) in Sanaa, where the domed chamber is also flanked to the north by an iwan with a mihrab, to the south by an apse, and to the west by another rectangular chamber. Richly carved and painted wooden cenotaphs were added over the graves of some 18th-century imams.

Unlike the Zaydi imams, the Rasulid rulers were normally buried in more modest tombs attached to their madrasas. The graves inside the mausoleum of Sultan al-Ashraf and his family (attached to the Ashrafiyya Mosque) are nonetheless marked by lavish cenotaphs built as domed baldaquin-style elements with carved and gilded stucco decoration.

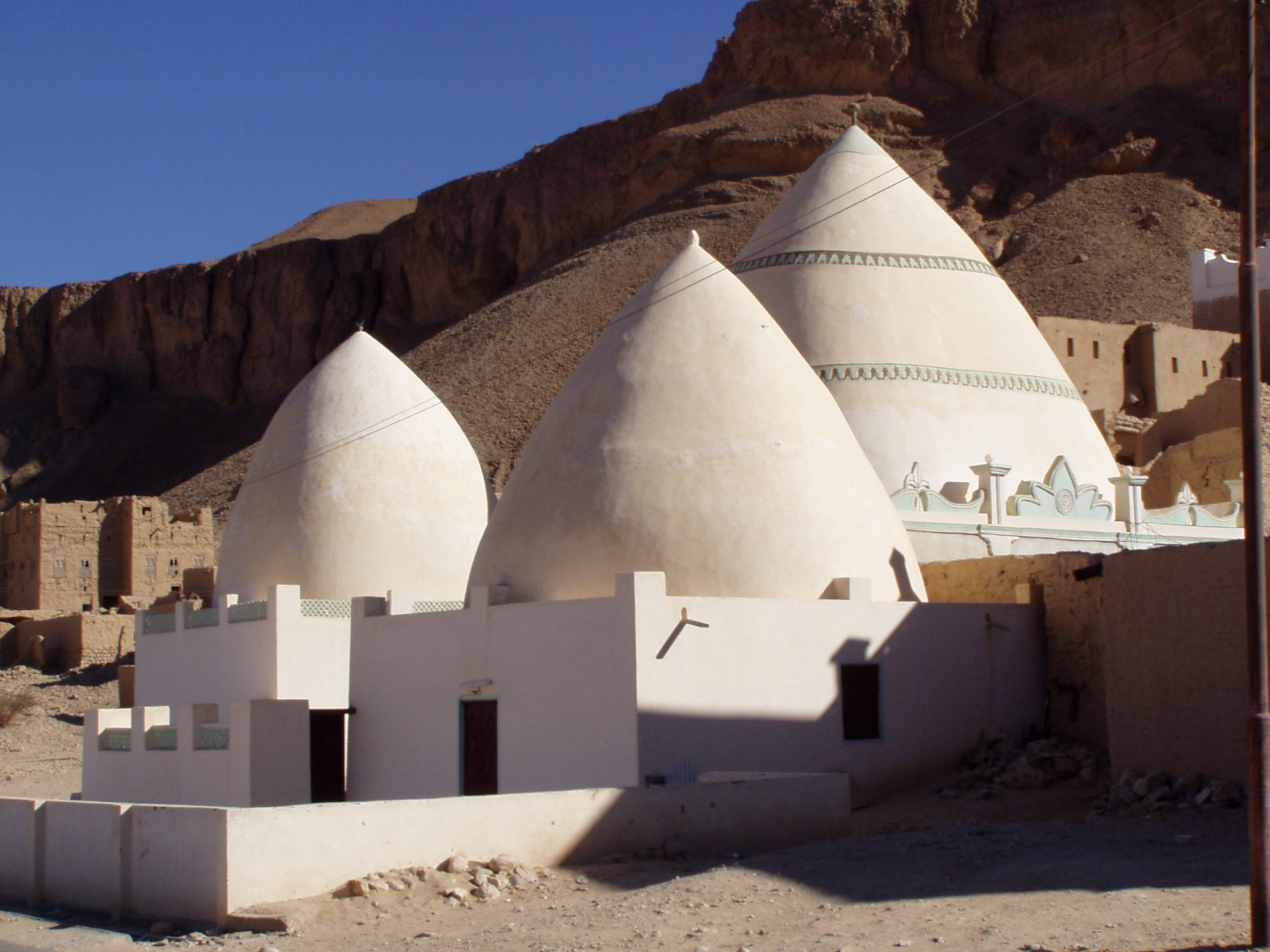
Hadrami-style domed mausoleums in Tarim

Domed mausoleums are also a tradition in the Hadramawt valley, where they usually covered the graves of local Muslim saints (awliya), such as the local Saiyids. These are often built as open kiosks consisting of domes resting on four pillars, with the space between the pillars later closed with walls or screens. The graves themselves were often covered by a wooden or bronze sarcophagus, which could be embellished with carved decoration and inscriptions. The most important tombs, which also acted as religious sanctuaries that received pilgrims, were typically rebuilt and expanded over time to become some of the most important monuments in the area. Among the most notable sanctuaries is Qabr Hud. In nearby Tarim, the oldest domed tomb is that of Mas'ud ibn Yamani (circa 1250). The town of Mashhad also hosts several large domed mausoleums of high quality construction. The oldest of the Mashhad tombs may be dated to 1591, though all the mausoleums were probably rebuilt in the 19th century.

== Domestic architecture ==
=== Overview ===
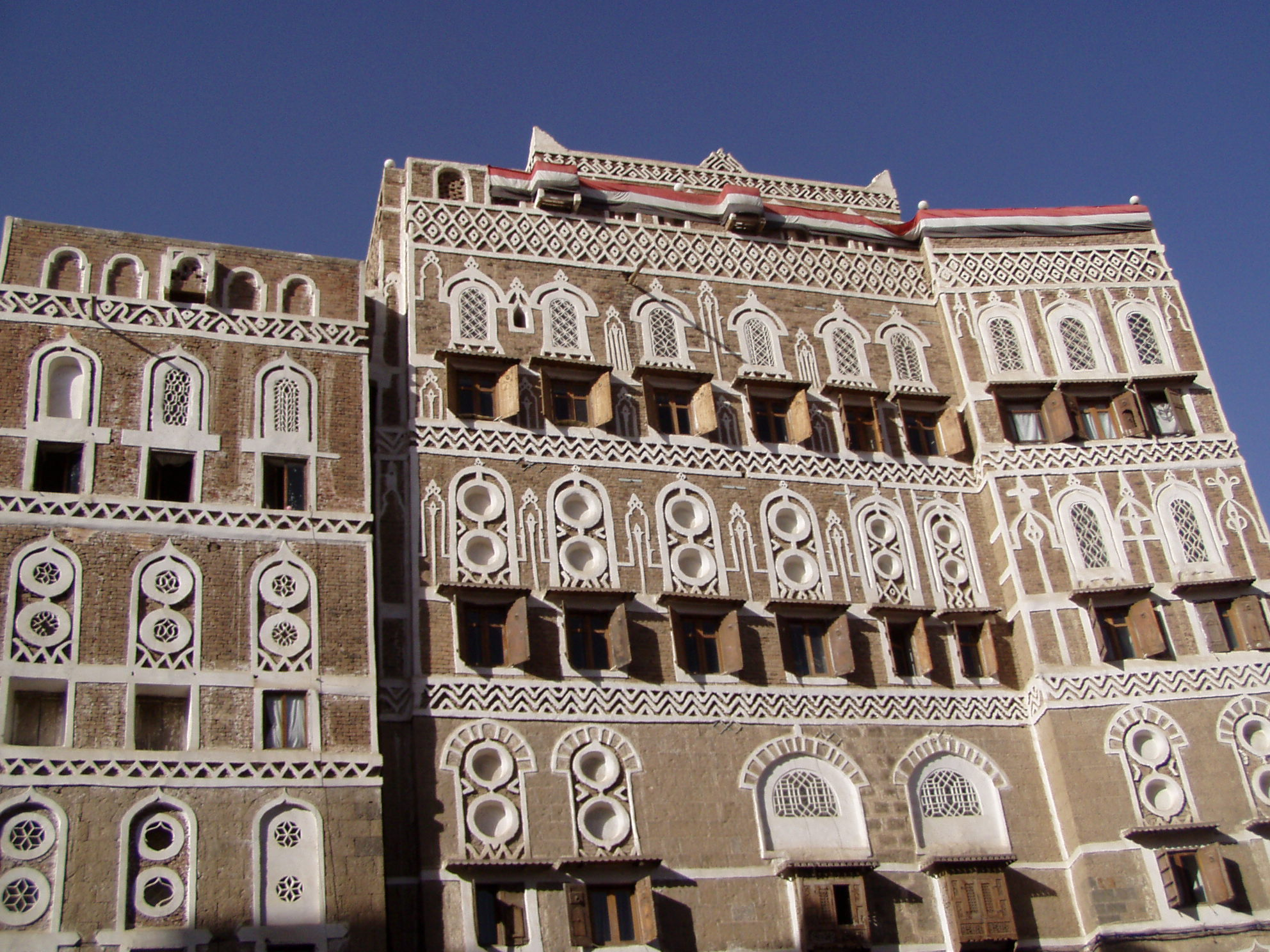
Example of traditional houses in the old city of Sanaa

Yemen is notable for its historic tower-houses, built on two or more floors. These houses vary in form and materials from region to region. They are typically built of mud (either rammed earth or sun-dried mud-brick), stone, or a combination of both, with timber used for roofs and floors. In some cases, as at Sanaa, the lower floors are built in heavier stone and the upper floors are built in lighter brick. Mud is sometimes mixed with straw and the walls are sometimes finished with lime. Coral stone is also used in coastal towns. Traditionally, the ground floor could be used for practical functions such as agriculture, the middle floors consisted of various multi-functional rooms, and the top floor often had a large reception room (mafraj) which enjoyed the best views.

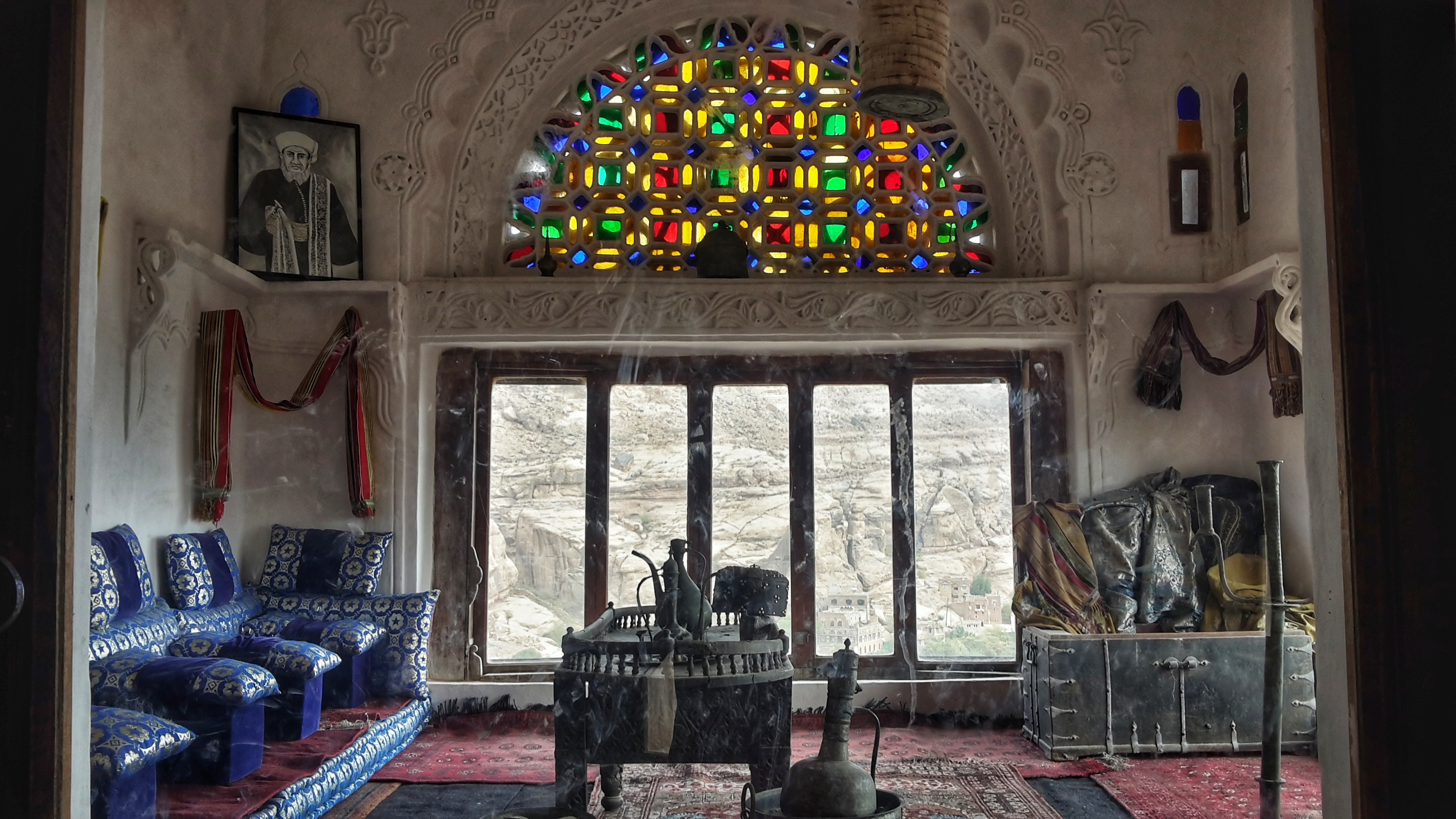
Room inside the Dar al-Hajar near Sanaa, with carved gypsum and coloured glass fanlight

Decoration of houses is often executed with gypsum, lime or some other plaster. At Sanaa, typical designs consist of bands of geometric motifs on the exterior created with protruding bricks that are whitewashed. Plasterwork is also found around the windows, and geometric or floral motifs can be used in coloured glass within the semicircular fanlights. This style can be seen also be seen at Dar al-Hajar, a palace built on a rocky outcrop in Wadi Zahr (15 kilometres north of Sanaa), dating to the 1930s, which features rich gypsum decoration and coloured glass fanlights.

Some villages and towns, such as Radda, were built around a fortified citadel (e.g. the Citadel of Rada'a), others were encircled by a high mud-brick wall (e.g. Shibam), and some were built so that the houses themselves formed an outer wall along an elevated position (e.g. Khawlan).

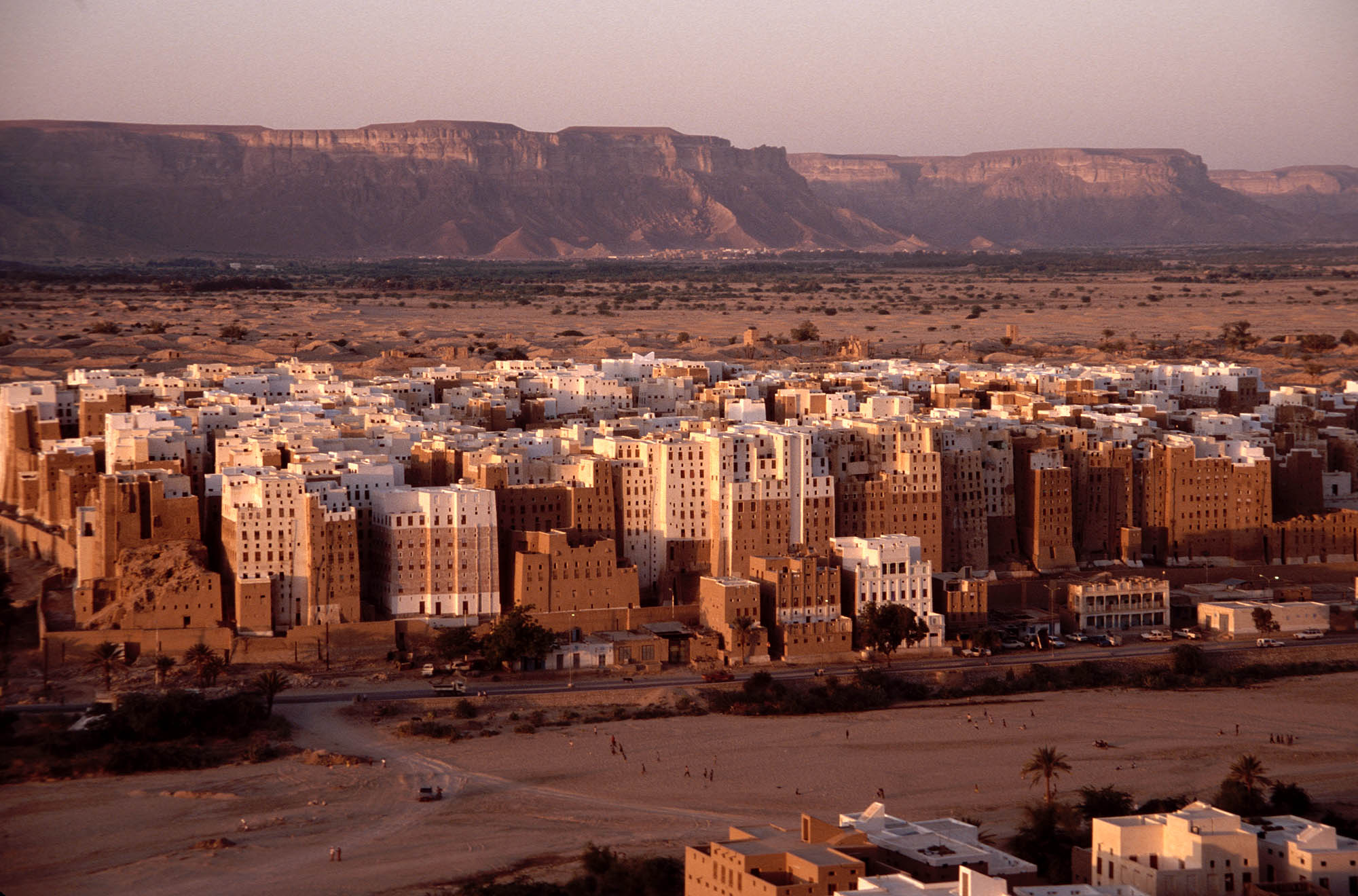
Shibam (in Hadramawt), an example of a historic fortified village with particularly tall tower-houses

While these structures are repaired and restored over time, this architectural style has remained generally unchanged for hundreds of years. The old city of Sanaa is a prominent example which preserves many of these houses. Since 1986 it is a UNESCO World Heritage Site, although its conservation is threatened by the ongoing Yemeni Civil War. The oldest house in the city is believed to one of stone and earth located in the Harat al-'Alami area, as its existence is documented as early as the 14th century.

=== Regional variations ===
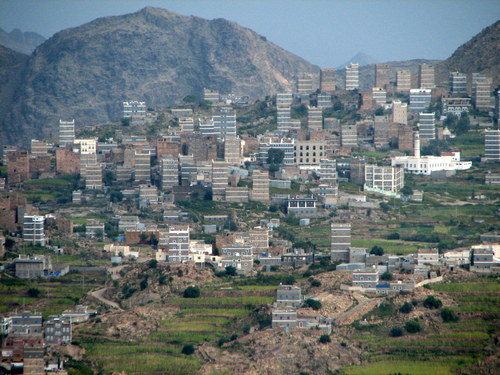
Tall buildings in Yafa'a (in Lahij), one of the Yemeni regions with a distinctive local architectural style

Various different styles of houses are found across different regions of Yemen. The mud-brick houses in the Hadramawt valley are especially tall, with Shibam being among the most famous. Locals were likely motivated to build their houses tall both as protection from the frequent tribal warfare in the region as well as to maximize the amount of land that could be preserved for agriculture in the dry valley. Generally, houses were entered via a single external door leading to a central passage and staircase. In tall houses, the first two floors had very few windows, if any, and were occupied by storage rooms for goods and animals, while the habitable rooms occupied the third level and above. The first habitable level included reception rooms for visitors while the private family areas were located on the floors above. Some of the largest rooms on the upper floors had external terraces.

Shibam has a unique concentration of very tall houses, which are built in mud-brick with stone foundations. Their walls taper from nearly 1 metre (3.3 ft) thick at the bottom to less than 30 centimetres (12 in) at the top. Their exterior was usually covered with a plaster made of mud mixed with straw, giving them a warm brown colour, except for the highest stories, which were covered with a white lime plaster.

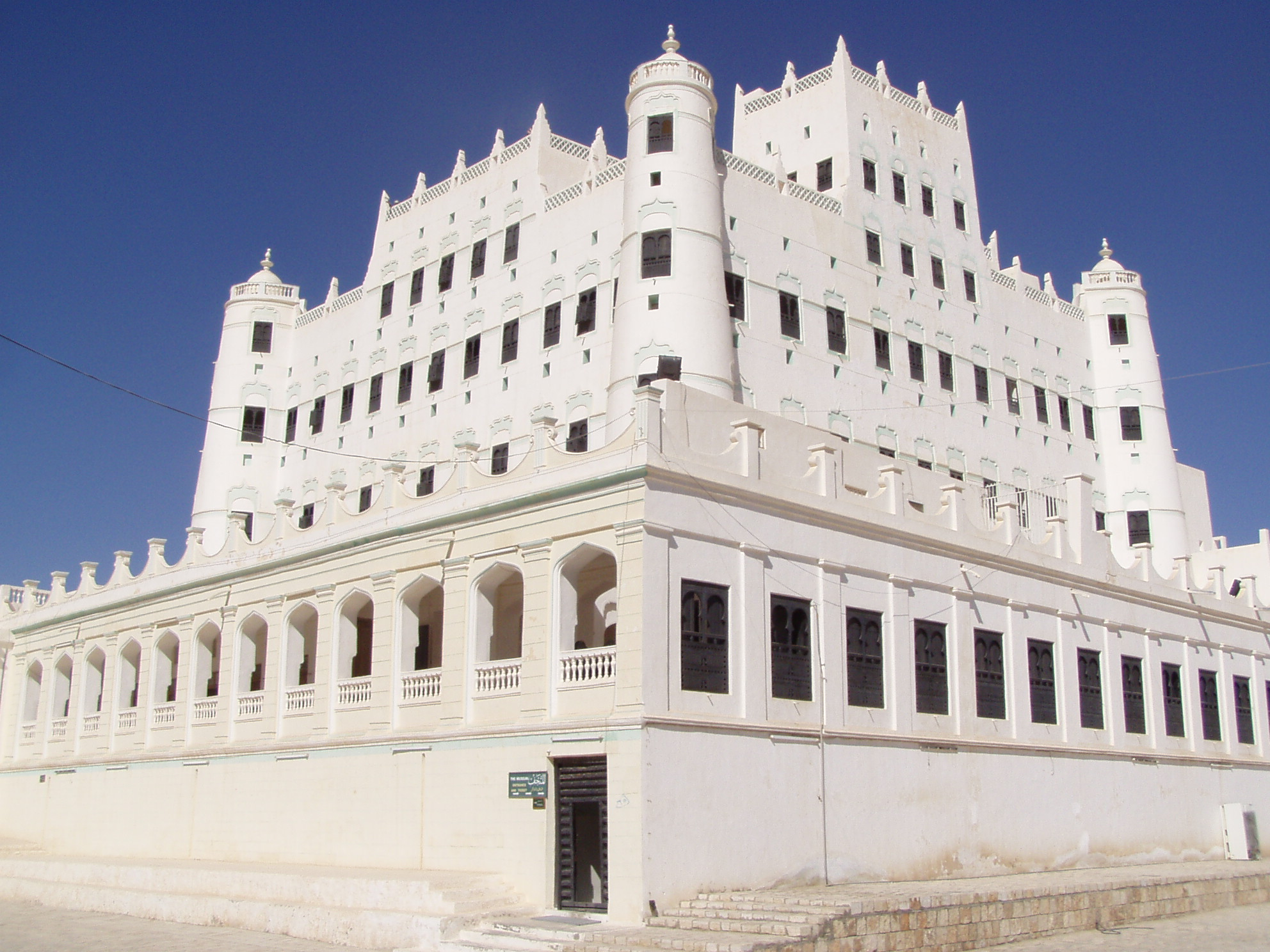
Say'un Palace, the Kathiri royal residence in Say'un (Hadramawt region)

At Say'un (or Seiyun), the Say'un Palace is the largest single building in the Hadramawt valley and one of the largest mud-brick structures in the world. It was the royal residence of the Kathiris, who ruled an autonomous sultanate in the region up to 1967. In both Say'un and nearby Tarim, the houses incorporate Southeast Asian, Indian, or colonial European influences due to the history of local notables working in Indonesia and other parts of the world from the 19th century onward, returning with knowledge of foreign styles and new amenities. Some of the mansions and villas they built had outer walled enclosures. Tarim includes a number of large square-plan palaces from the Kathiri period. The most impressive is that built for Sayyid Umar ibn Shaykh al-Kaf, which has tall windows, an overall South Asian or Indonesian appearance, and whose exterior was once painted in deep blue.

At Saada and nearby villages, traditional houses are built with a mud and straw mixture and have a tapered shape, with the top of the house marked by pointed protrusions of gypsum. Some houses have window panes made of alabaster.

In the Tihama plain along the coast, including towns like Zabid, the buildings are instead built low, with one or two stories. They tend to be built of reeds and palm wood in the north or of rubble stone and brick in the south. Houses in Zabid tend to also omit exterior decoration and focus on interior decoration instead.
