= Al-Asha'ir Mosque =

Mosque in Zabid, Yemen

al-Asha'ir Mosque جامع الأشاعرة
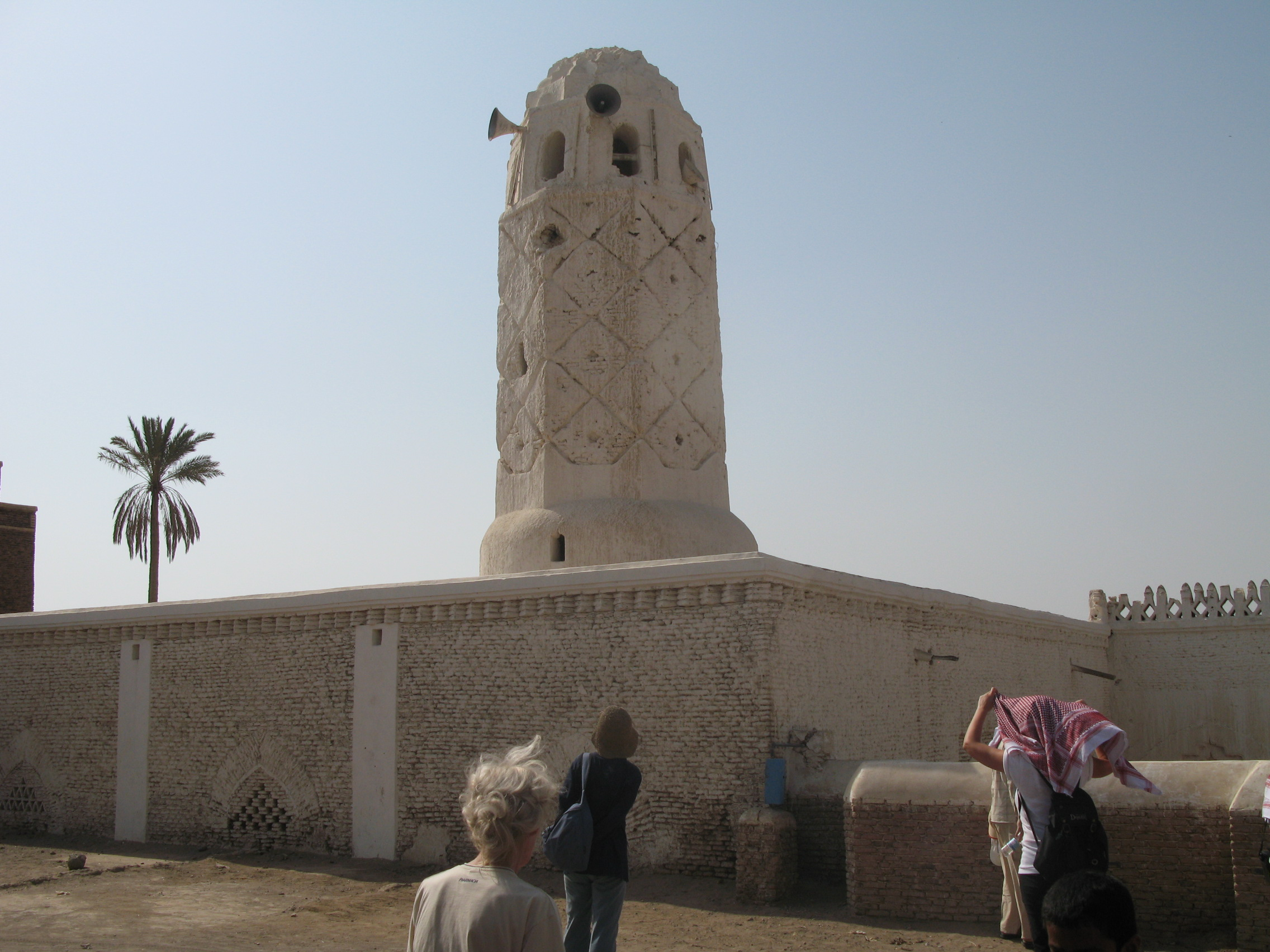

Religion
- Affiliation: Islam
- Region: West Asia
- Status: Active

Location
- Location: Zabid, Yemen
- Interactive map of al-Asha'ir Mosque جامع الأشاعرة
- Coordinates: 14°11′42.6″N 43°19′0.0″E

Architecture
- Type: Mosque
- Style: Islamic, Yemeni
- Completed: 10th–11th century
- Minaret: 1

The al-Asha'ir Mosque (جامع الأشاعرة), is an ancient mosque in the historic city of Zabid, Yemen, a UNESCO World Heritage Site.

== History ==
The mosque is believed to be the oldest in the city. There is disagreement among sources as to whether the mosque was first built by Abu Musa al-Ash'ari, a sahabi or companion of the Islamic prophet Muhammad (7th century). According to historian Noha Sadek, the current mosque is said to have been built by the Ziyadid ruler al-Husayn ibn Salamah (r. 983–1012), who was also responsible for building the city's main Great Mosque. Both of these mosques became centers of Islamic scholarship after their construction.

== Architecture ==
The mosque occupies a rectangular area (50.35 x 50.24 m) and contains an open sahn, or courtyard, measuring 11 x 5 square meters. Surrounded by four corridors, the qibla can be accessed through the main gate located on the south side or through the mosque's other doors, which open directly to the qibla hallway. It is worth mentioning that the mihrab is not in the middle of the qibla wall. This is due to the repeated additions to the mosque: for example, a wooden platform inside the wall to the east of the mihrab, a pulpit dating back to the year 1542.

The minaret of the mosque is located above the southern hallway. It has a square base topped by an octagonal body adorned with muqarnas. The minaret is covered by a fortress dome on the top, which is a design common among minarets in Zabid.

The mosque has a wooden chair that was dedicated to the reading of the Prophet's Hadith and is still in the qibla hallway to this day since the date of its creation in the year 927.

The Mosque of Al-Asha'ir also functioned as an Islamic university where students from all over Yemen and the Islamic world lived and studied.

== See also ==
- List of mosques in Yemen
