= Seiyun Palace =

Building in Yemen

- قصر سيئون
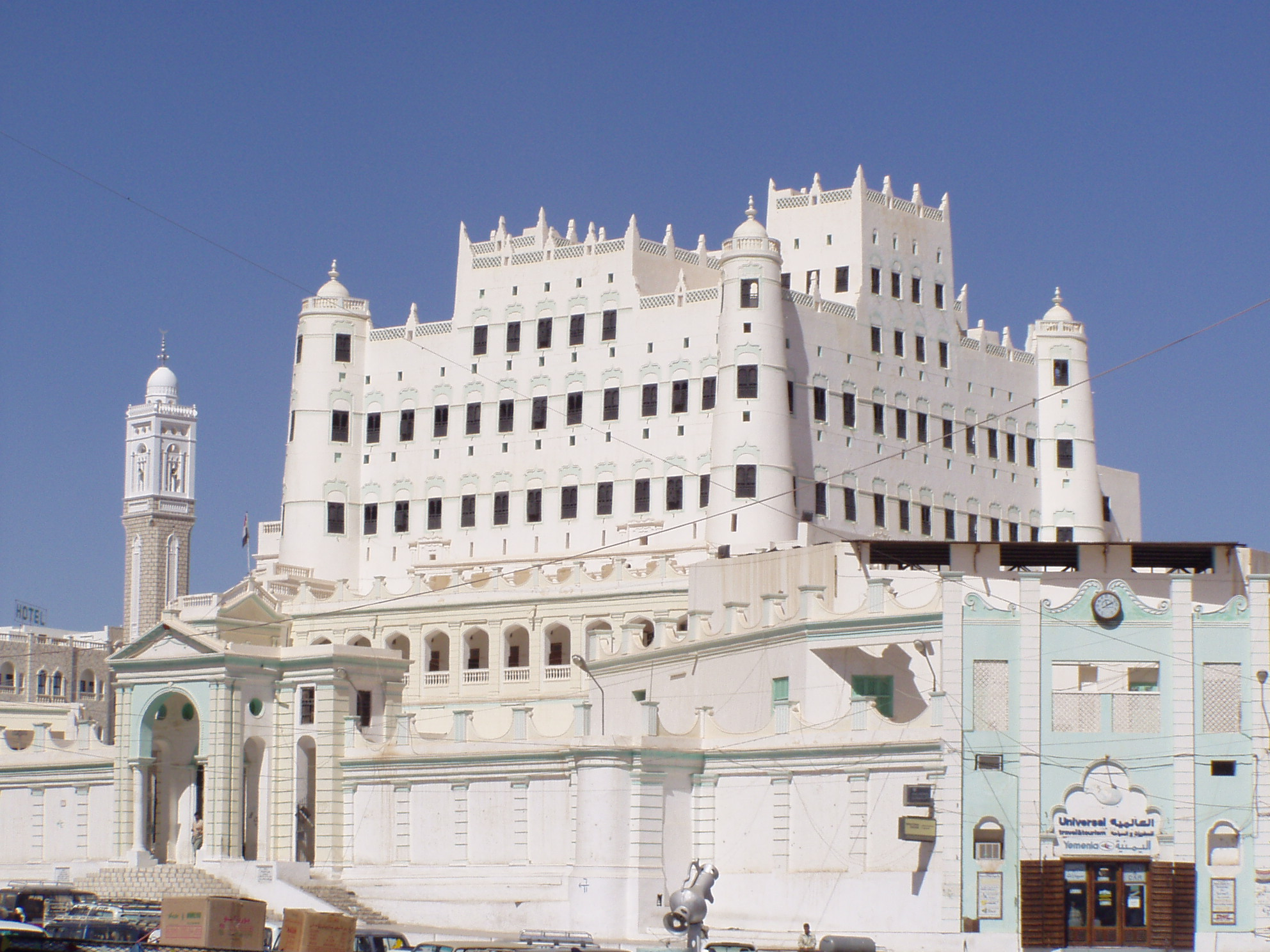

- Location within Yemen
- Alternative names: Kathiri Palace (Arabic: قصر الكثيري, romanized: Qasr Al-Kathiri)

General information
- Architectural style: Hadhrami
- Location: Seiyun, Yemen
- Coordinates: 15°58′N 48°47′E
- Year built: 1584

Technical details
- Material: Mudbrick
- Floor count: 7

Design and construction
- Known for: world’s largest mudbrick structure

The Seiyun Palace is a palace located in the town of Seiyun in the Hadhramaut Governorate in eastern Yemen. It is one of the world’s largest mud-brick structures. The palace was the royal residence of the sultans of Kathiri Dynasty of Hadhramaut until 1967.

== History ==
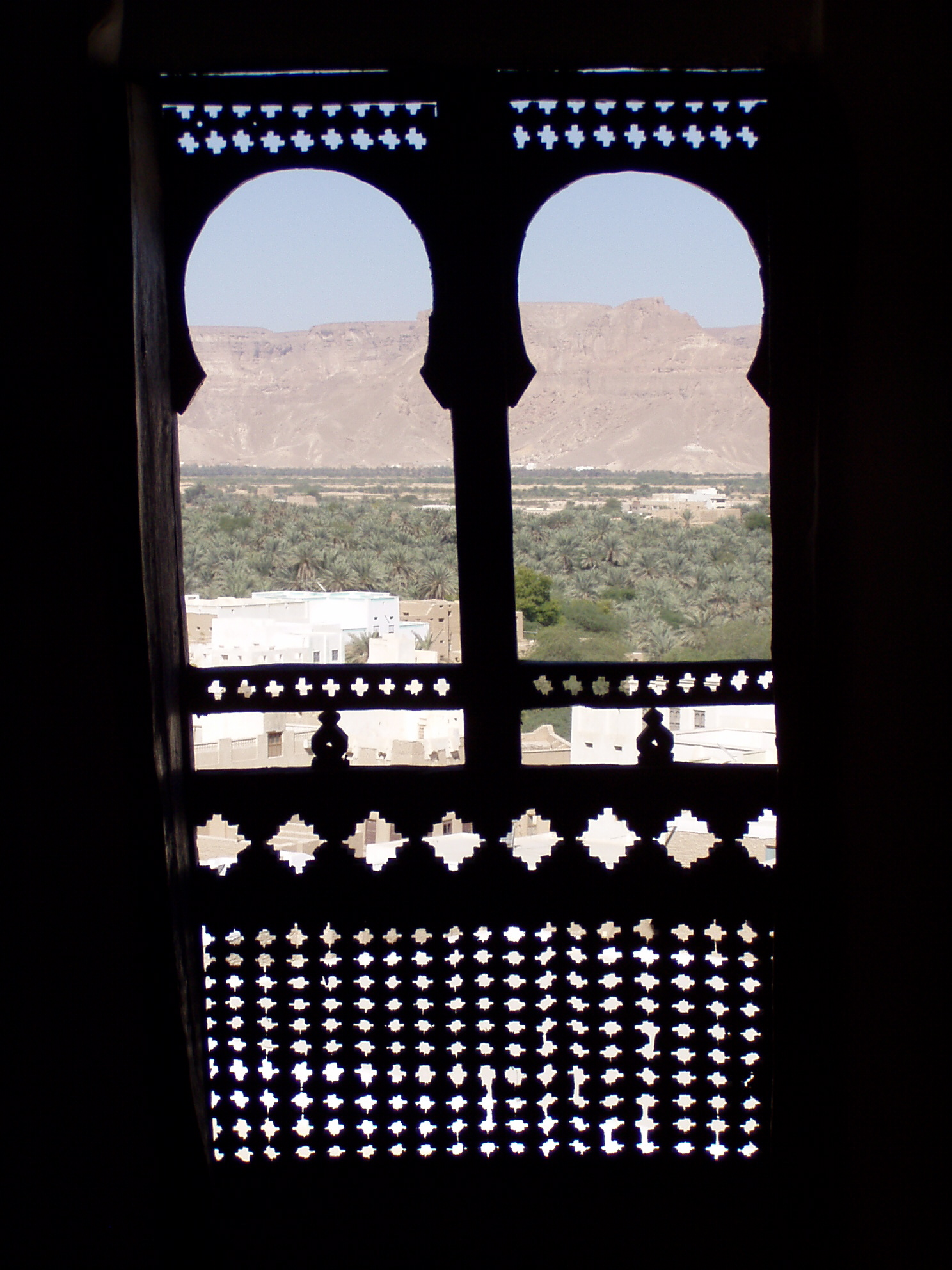
A window of the palace

The Seiyun Palace in Hadhramaut was specific to the sultans of the Kathiri state that ruled the Hadhramaut valley. Sultan Badr Abu Tuwaireq resided in the palace in 1584 after he restored it and built a mosque right next to it. Ever since, Seiyun has become the capital of the Kathiri state as well as Hadhramaut valley.

In 1984, a museum was inaugurated in the palace, comprising various artifacts collected after the conduction of scientific-related excavation missions, namely the Yemeni-Soviet mission. The museum was closed in 2015 due to the Yemeni Civil War when Al-Qaeda entered Hadramawt.

== Architecture ==
The palace resembles a giant sandcastle with turrets at its corners. it consists of seven floors and comprises 45 rooms in addition to several outbuildings and stores.

The museum showcases items excavated in the province, including tombstones that date back to the Stone Age and the dawn of civilisation in Yemen. There are also Bronze Age statues, pottery and ancient manuscripts from the pre-Islamic period. However, the museum's most prized possessions are stashed away, for fear of any of Yemen's warring groups targeting them.

== Renovation ==
Because of the ongoing conflict, it was at 'risk of collapse', left vulnerable by years of neglect and rain damage, including from the 2020 Yemen flood that killed dozens of people.

In 2022, the UNESCO renovated the palace with SDRPY funding.

== Cultural significance ==
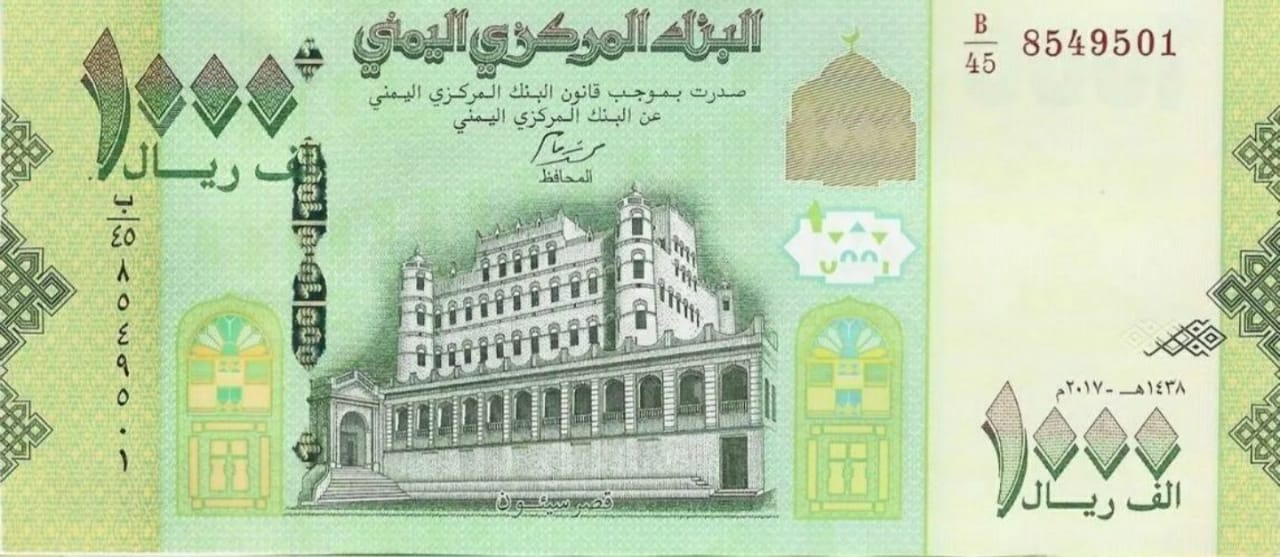
The 1000 Yemeni Rials banknote

The palace is featured on Yemen's 1,000-rial banknote, the highest denomination.
