= Great Mosque of Zabid =

Mosque in Zabid, Yemen

Religion
- Affiliation: Islam
- Status: Active

Location
- Location: Zabid, Yemen
- Interactive map of Great Mosque of Zabid
- Coordinates: 14°11′45″N 43°18′45″E

Architecture
- Type: Mosque
- Style: Islamic, Yemeni
- Completed: 10th–11th century
- Minaret: 1

The Great Mosque of Zabid is a historic congregational mosque in the old city of Zabid, Yemen.

== History ==
According to scholar Noha Sadek, the mosque is said to have been built by the Ziyadid ruler al-Husayn ibn Salamah (r. 983–1012), who was also responsible for building the al-Asha'ir Mosque, another famous mosque in the city. Both mosques became centers of Islamic scholarship in the city's heyday. The mosque underwent modification and reconstruction under the Ayyubid dynasty, circa 1200, at which point it acquired most of its present form. The brick minaret, one of the oldest preserved minarets in Yemen (along with those of the Great Mosque of Sana'a and the mosque of Zafar Dhibin), dates from this period. The mosque went through further restoration under the Tahirid dynasty in 1492.

== Architecture ==
The form of the mosque is that of a large hypostyle building with a central courtyard, reminiscent of the classic early Arab mosque plan in Islamic architecture. The minaret has an octagonal shaft and is distinguished by its decorative brickwork.
