= Zabid =

Zabid زَبِيد
- Town
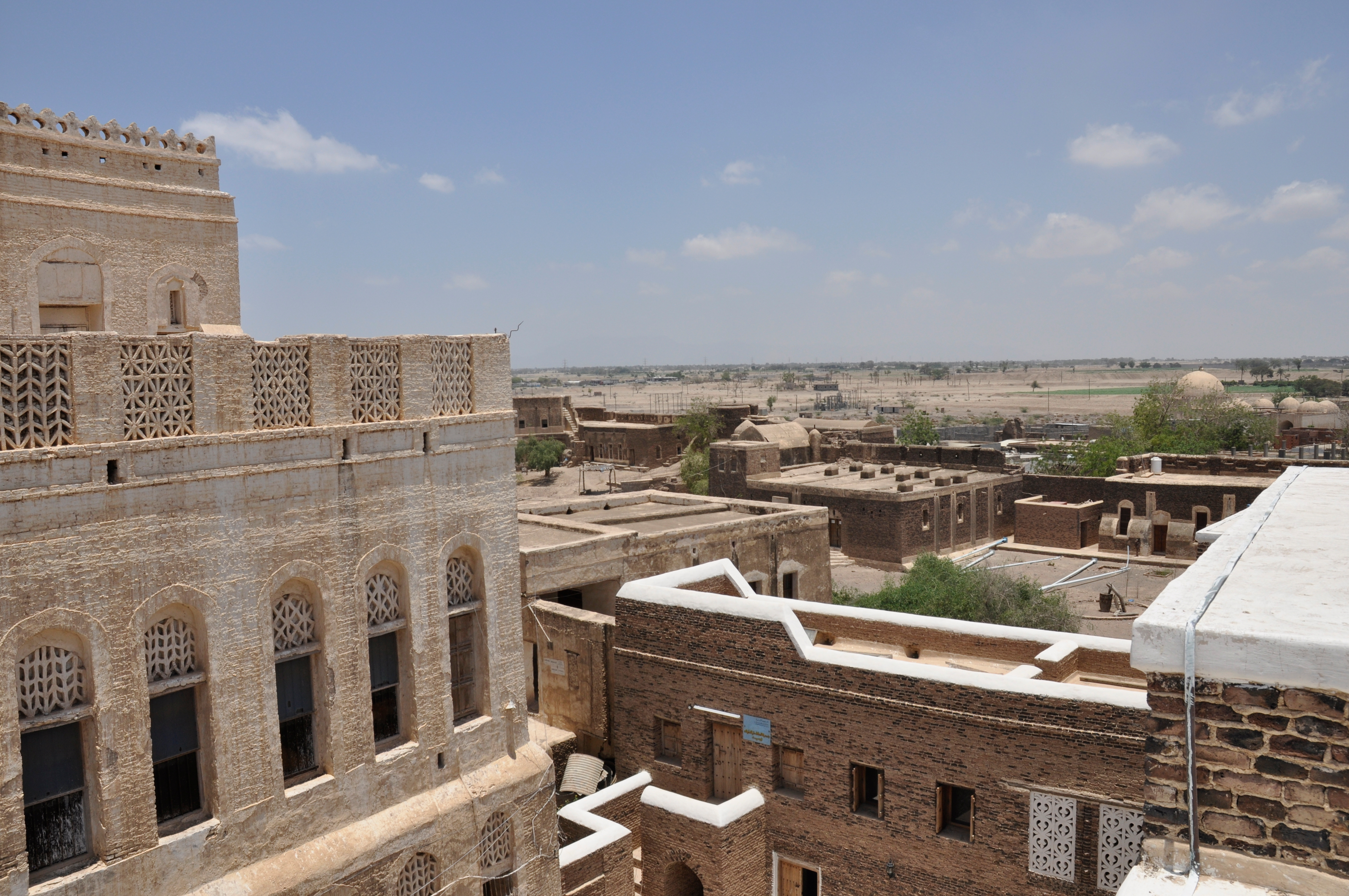
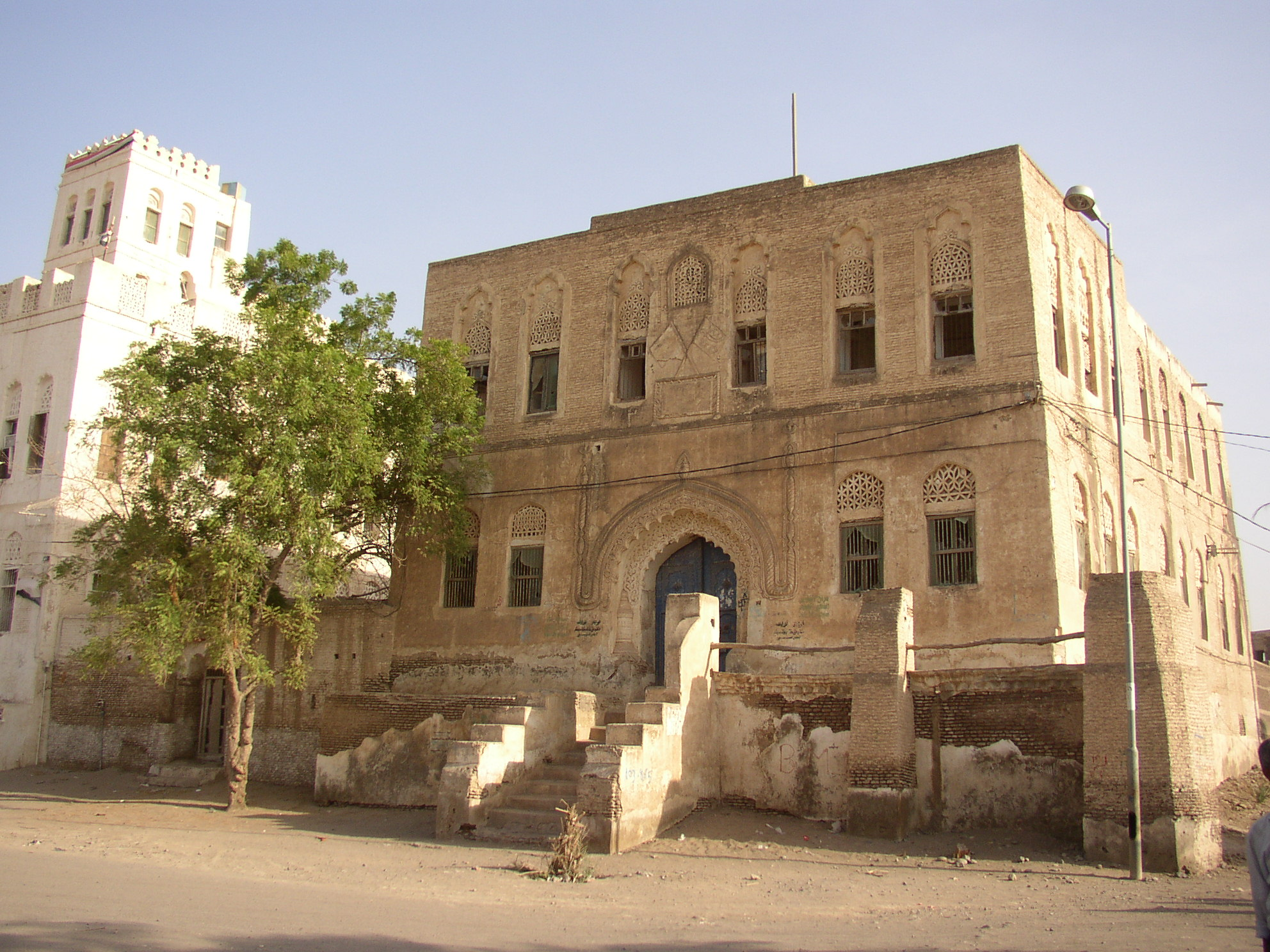
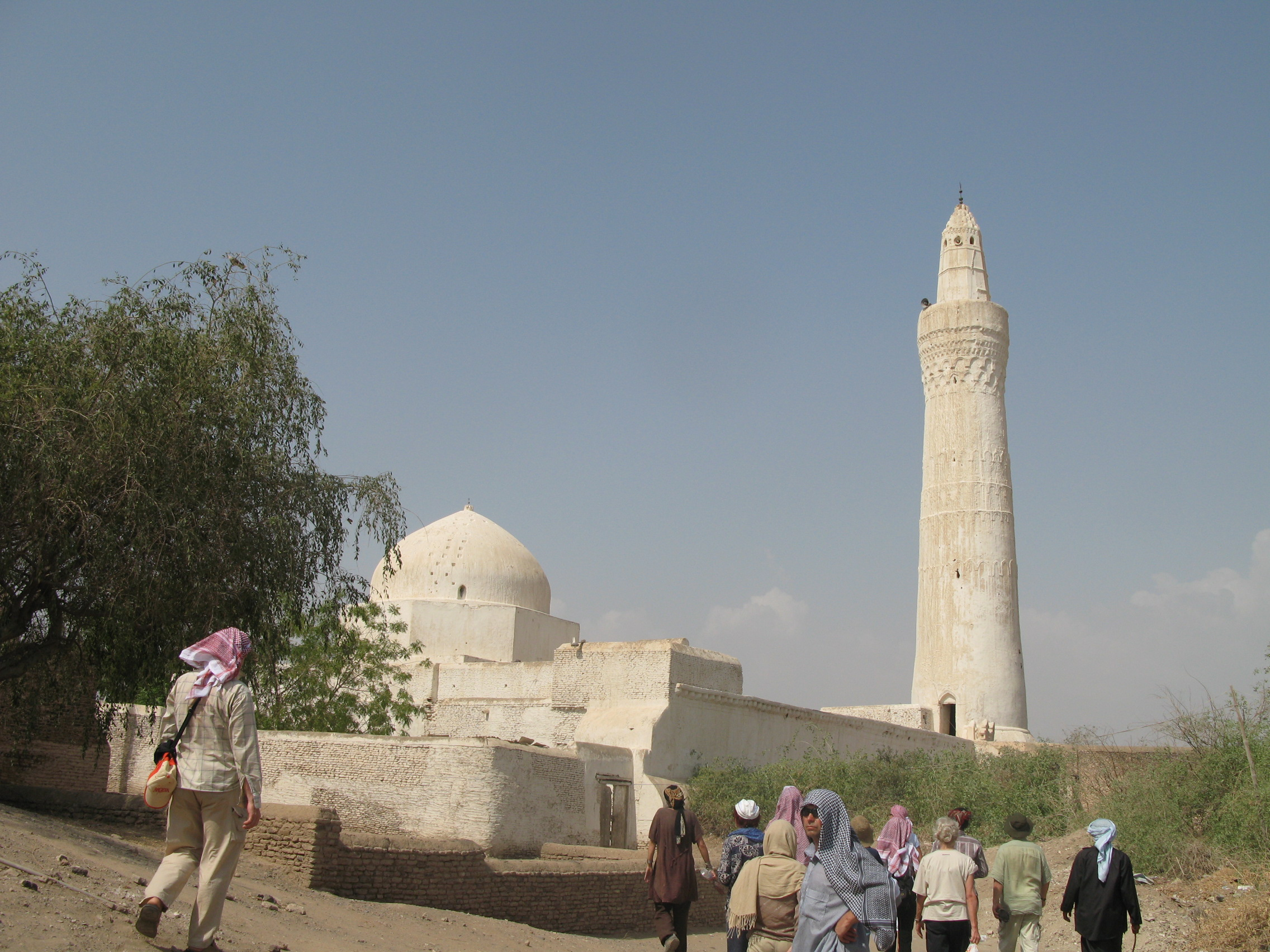
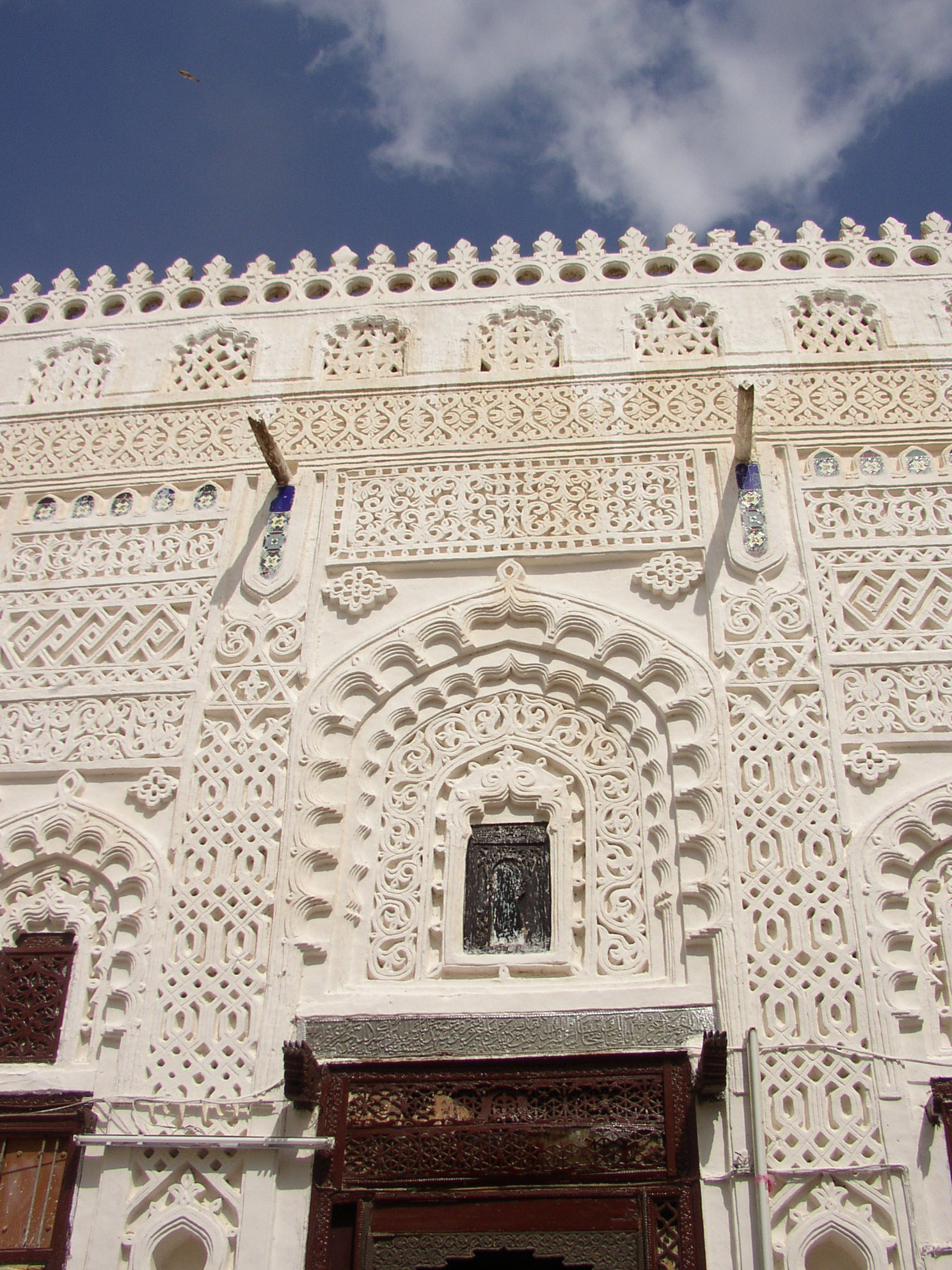
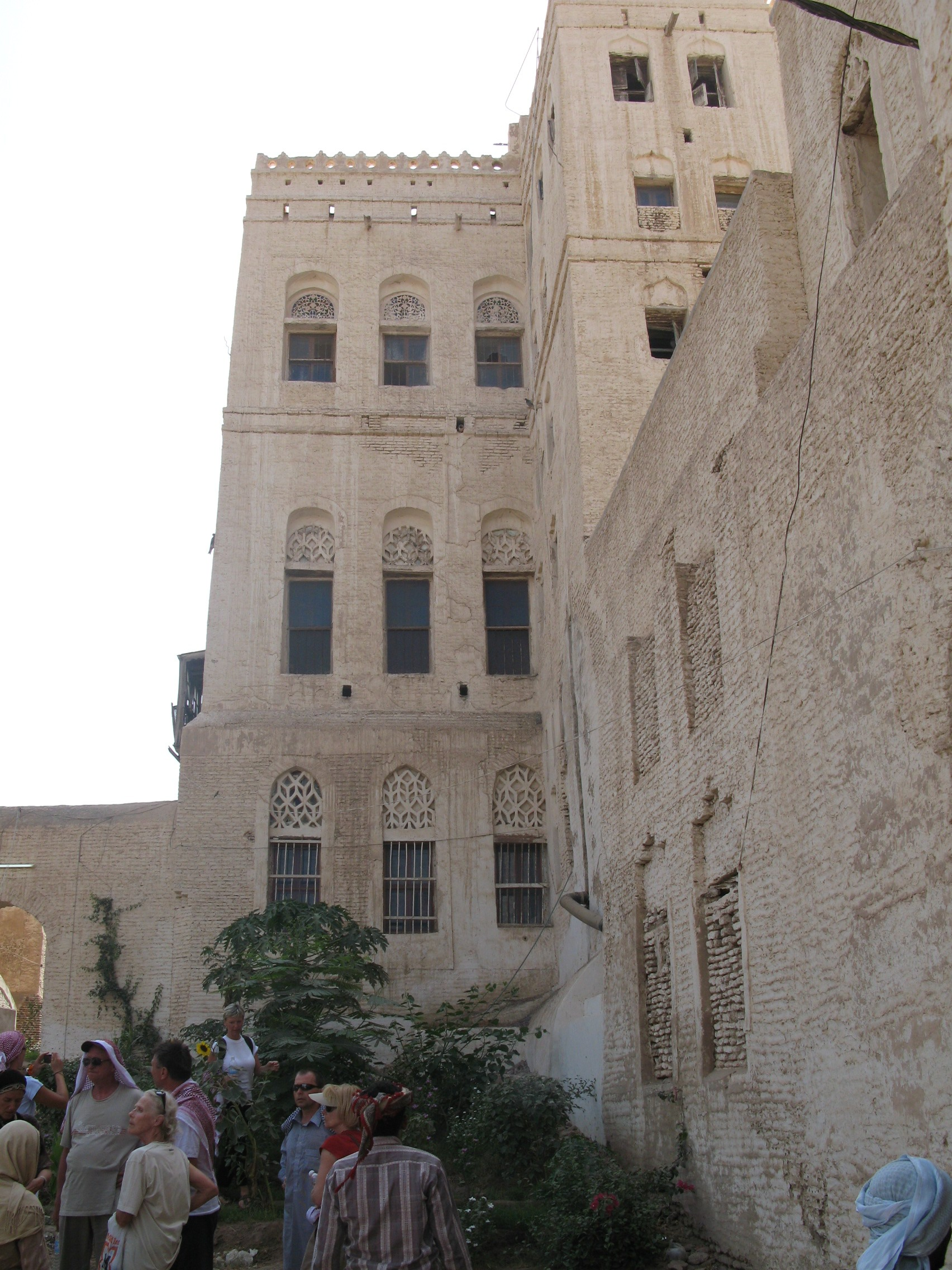
- Clockwise from top: Citadel; Zabid skyline, Al-Iskanderiya or Citadel Mosque, Administration building within the citadel, architecture pattern, historic town

- Location in Yemen
- Coordinates: 14°12′N 43°19′E
- Country: Yemen
- Governorate: Al Hudaydah Governorate
- District: Zabid
- Time zone: Yemen Standard Time

UNESCO World Heritage Site
- Official name: Historic Town of Zabid
- Criteria: Cultural: (ii), (iv), (vi)
- Reference: 611
- Inscription: 1993 (17th Session)
- Endangered: 2000–...

Zabid (Arabic: زَبِيد) (also spelled Zabīd, Zabeed and Zebid) is a town with an urban population of around 52,590 people, located on Yemen's western coastal plain. It is one of the oldest towns in Yemen, and has been a UNESCO World Heritage Site since 1993. However, in 2000, the historic core placed on the List of World Heritage in Danger. The town was the capital of several ruling dynasties in Yemen over many centuries.

== History ==
The town is one of the oldest in Yemen. It was originally a village known as al-Husayb that was inhabited by the Asha'ir tribe. It later took on the name of the Wadi Zabid, the valley to its south. According to tradition, the town's early history is associated with Abu Musa al-Ash'ari, one of the companions of the Islamic prophet Muhammad, who is said to have built the al-Asha'ir Mosque as the fifth mosque in the history of Islam.

The present town was created circa 820 by Muhammad ibn Abdallah ibn Ziyad, the founder of the Ziyadid dynasty, who had been sent by the Abbasid caliph al-Ma'mun to suppress a rebellion of the Asha'ir and Akk tribes. It became the capital of the Ziyadids (up to 1016) and continued to serve this role under their successors, the Najahid dynasty (from 1022 to 1158) and the Mahdids (1158 to 1174). During this time the city grew in importance. Its mosques, including the al-Asha'ir Mosque and the Great Mosque, became centers of Islamic learning. Its location on the road between Mecca and Aden also granted the city economic prosperity.

In 1067, during the pilgrimage to Mecca, the Banu Najah clan under Sa'id Ibn Najah, the prince of Zabid, attacked the travel party of the Sulayhid sultan, Ali al-Sulayhi, and his wife Asma bint Shihab. They killed Ali and took Asma prisoner. She was sequestered in a secret prison in Zabid, and the severed head of her spouse was reportedly planted on a pole visible from her cell. After a year's imprisonment, she managed to get a message through to her son and daughter-in-law in Sanaa, and her son stormed Zabid and freed her.

Ali ibn Mahdi, a native of the Yemeni highlands, founded the Mahdid dynasty in the Tihama region. Al-Himyari and his followers burned down several districts north of Zabid. He had sworn to put the Abyssinians into slavery and ordered his men to kill everyone, including the handicapped. Out of desperation, the people of Zabid sought assistance from the Zaydi imam Ahmed ibn Sulayman against al-Himyari. The Zaydi imam ordered Fatiq III to be executed on account of his alleged homosexuality. Fatiq III was either killed by the Imam, the Mahdids, or his own soldiers. With this event, the slave dynasty came an end and the Mahdids took over Zabid in 1158.

After the Ayyubids took control of Yemen in 1174, Zabid continued to be the economic and political center of the region. Under the Rasulid dynasty (1229–1454), the official capital was moved to Taiz but the rulers continued to use Zabid as a winter residence. The city reached its apogee during this period and had a larger number of palaces, gardens, and religious institutions than any other city in Yemen. Al-Khazraji, a local 14th-century Arab writer, claimed that the city counted between 230 and 240 mosques. Even today, the city reportedly has the highest concentration of mosques in Yemen.

Hadım Suleiman Pasha extended the Ottoman Empire's authority to include Zabid in 1539. Zabid became the administrative headquarters of Yemen Eyalet.

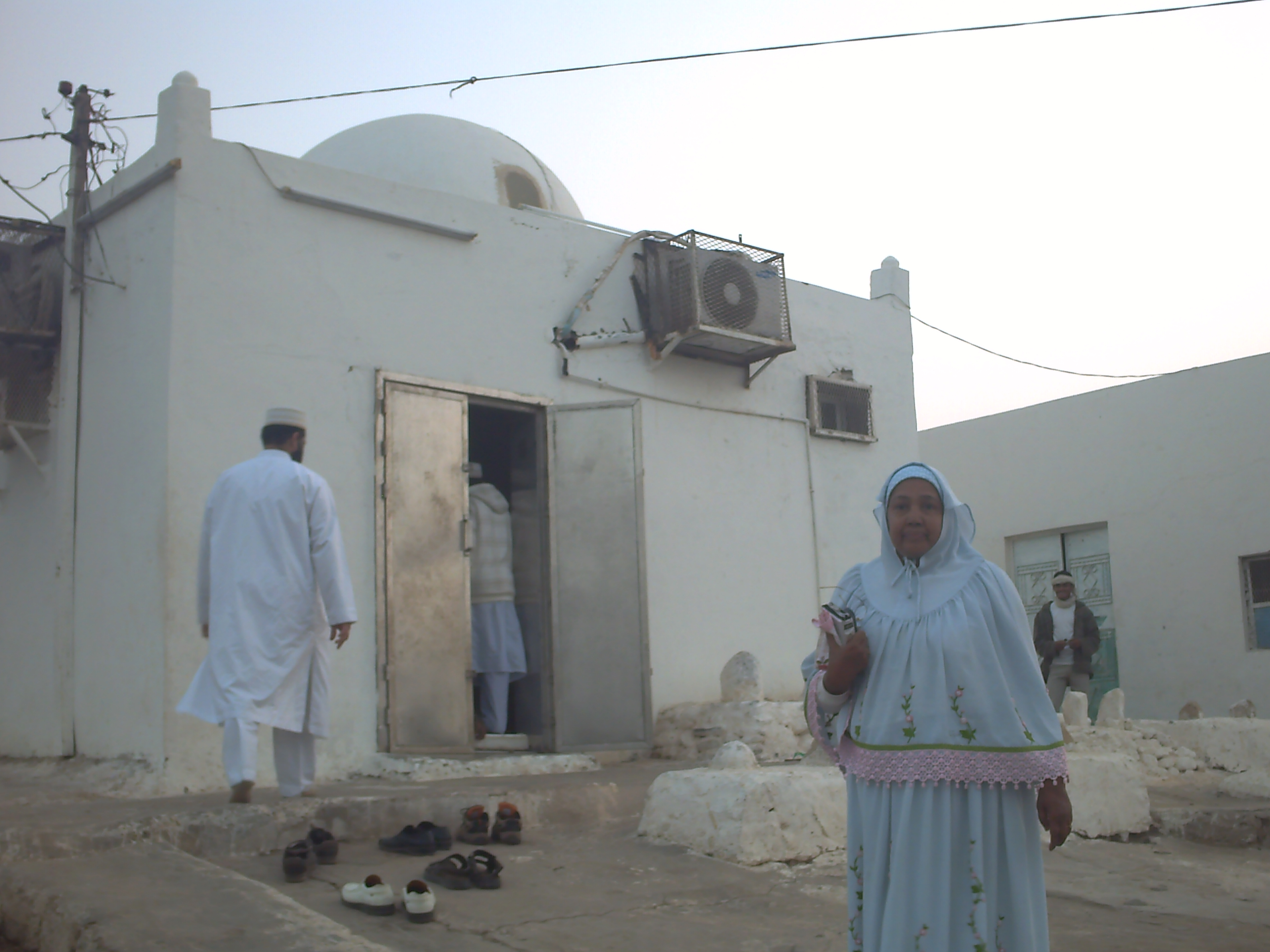
Mausoleum Muhammad Ezzuddin, Zabid, Yemen

Today, however, Zabid is at the economic margins of modern Yemen. Muhammad Abdul-Wali's novel Sana'a: An Open City tells the story of a young man who traveled to Zabid in the mid-20th century and was surprised to find the town had become a backwater. Some descendants of the Rasulids continue to use Zabid alongside their nobiliary particles.

== Geography ==
Zabid has an urban population of around 52,590 persons. It is located on Yemen's western coastal plain, in the Tihama region.

== World Heritage Site ==
The historic quarter was declared a World Heritage Site by UNESCO in 1993. Zabid's Great Mosque occupies a prominent place in the town. The vestiges of its university can also be visited. In 2000, Zabid was listed on the List of World Heritage in Danger; the listing was made at the behest of the Yemeni government due to a state of poor upkeep and conservation. According to a UNESCO report, roughly "40% of the city's houses have been replaced by concrete buildings, and other houses and the ancient souk are in a deteriorating state." The ongoing Yemeni civil war also poses a threat to Zabid's heritage. Some historic homes were damaged by coalition bombing in 2015. Further concerns were raised in 2018 as fighting drew near to the city.

== Economy ==
As of 1920, Zabid was one of two places in Arabia growing indigo. Zabid also grows and produces cotton. The British cite tribal disputes as dampening the economy in Zabid during the early 20th century.

== Gallery ==
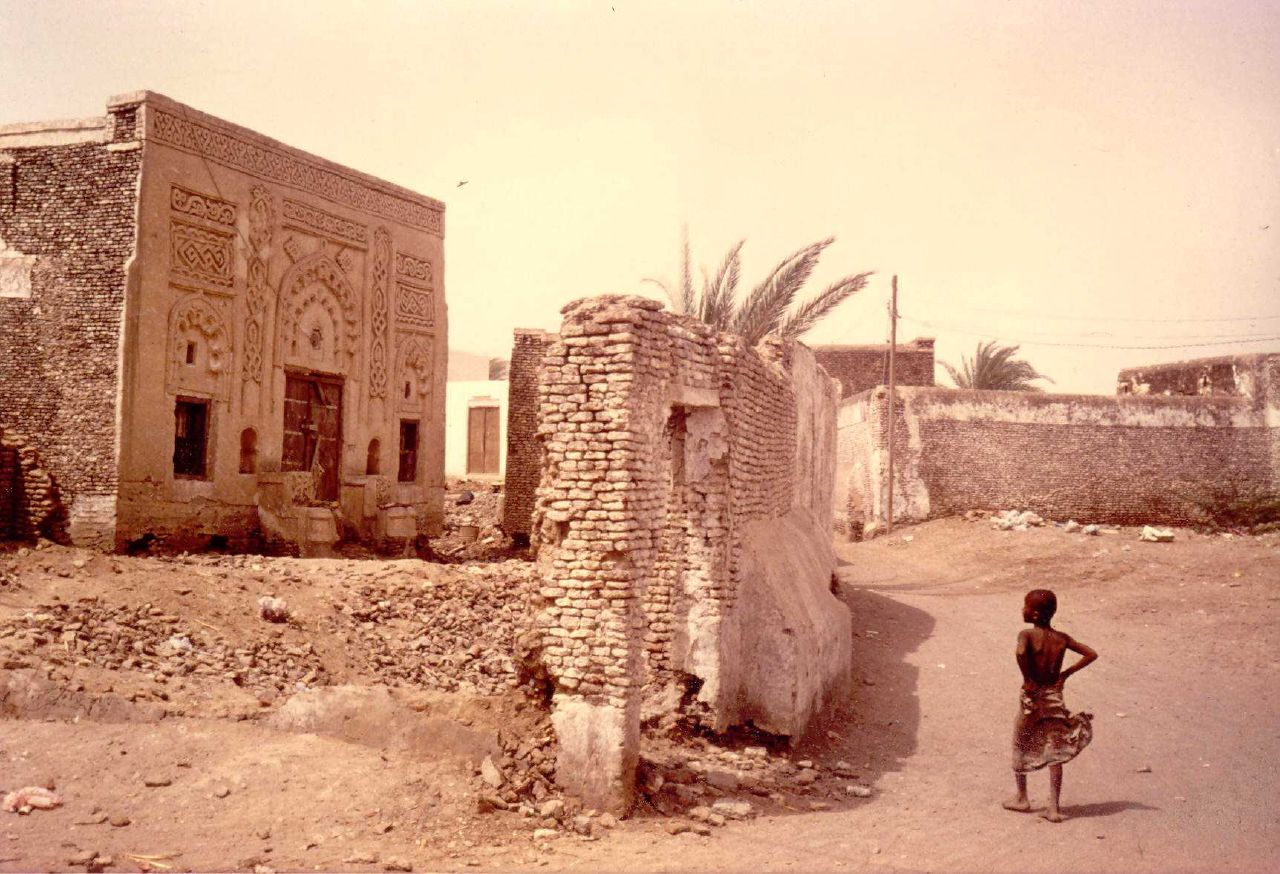
House and street in the historic quarter

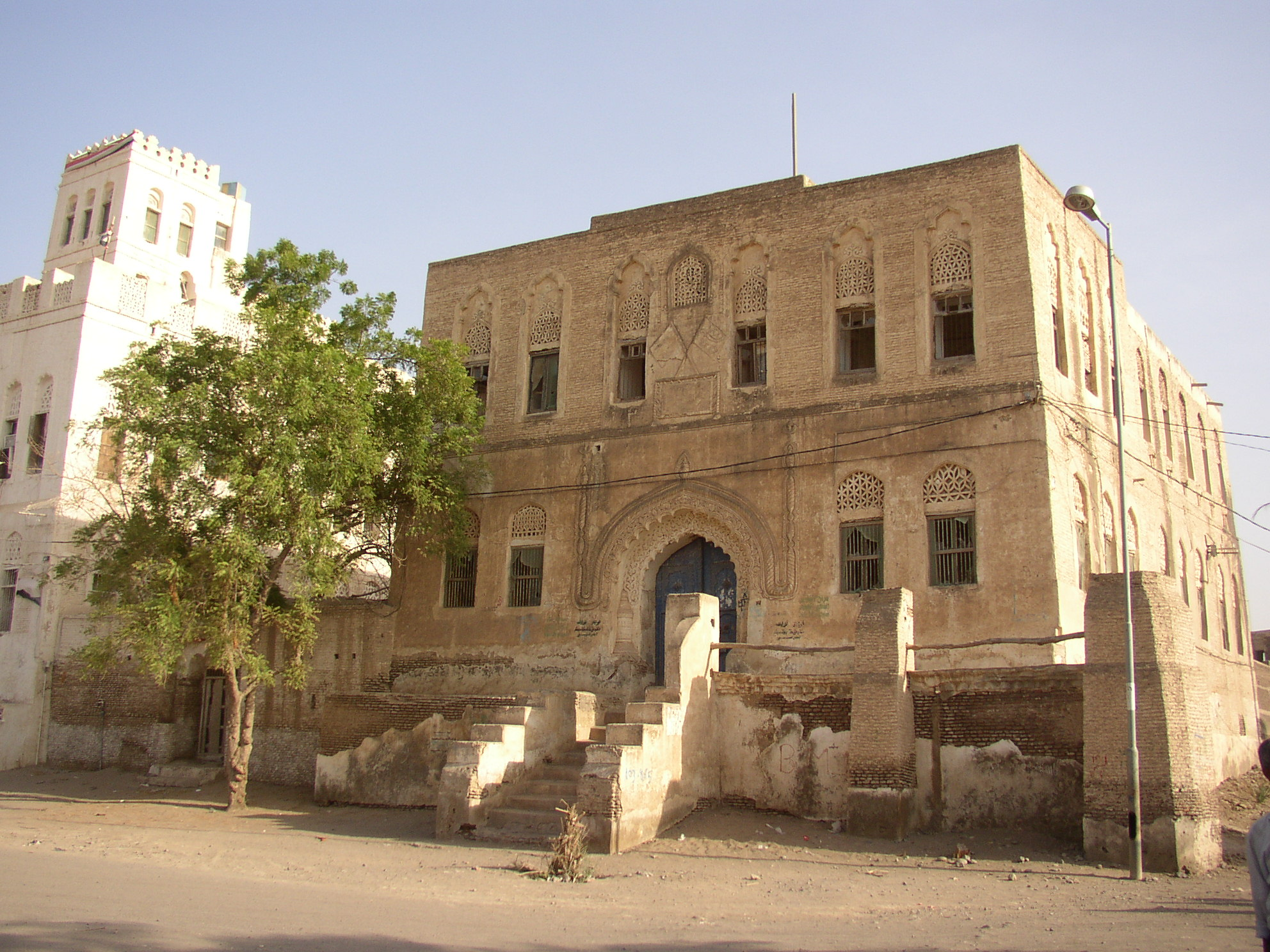
Houses in the historic quarter

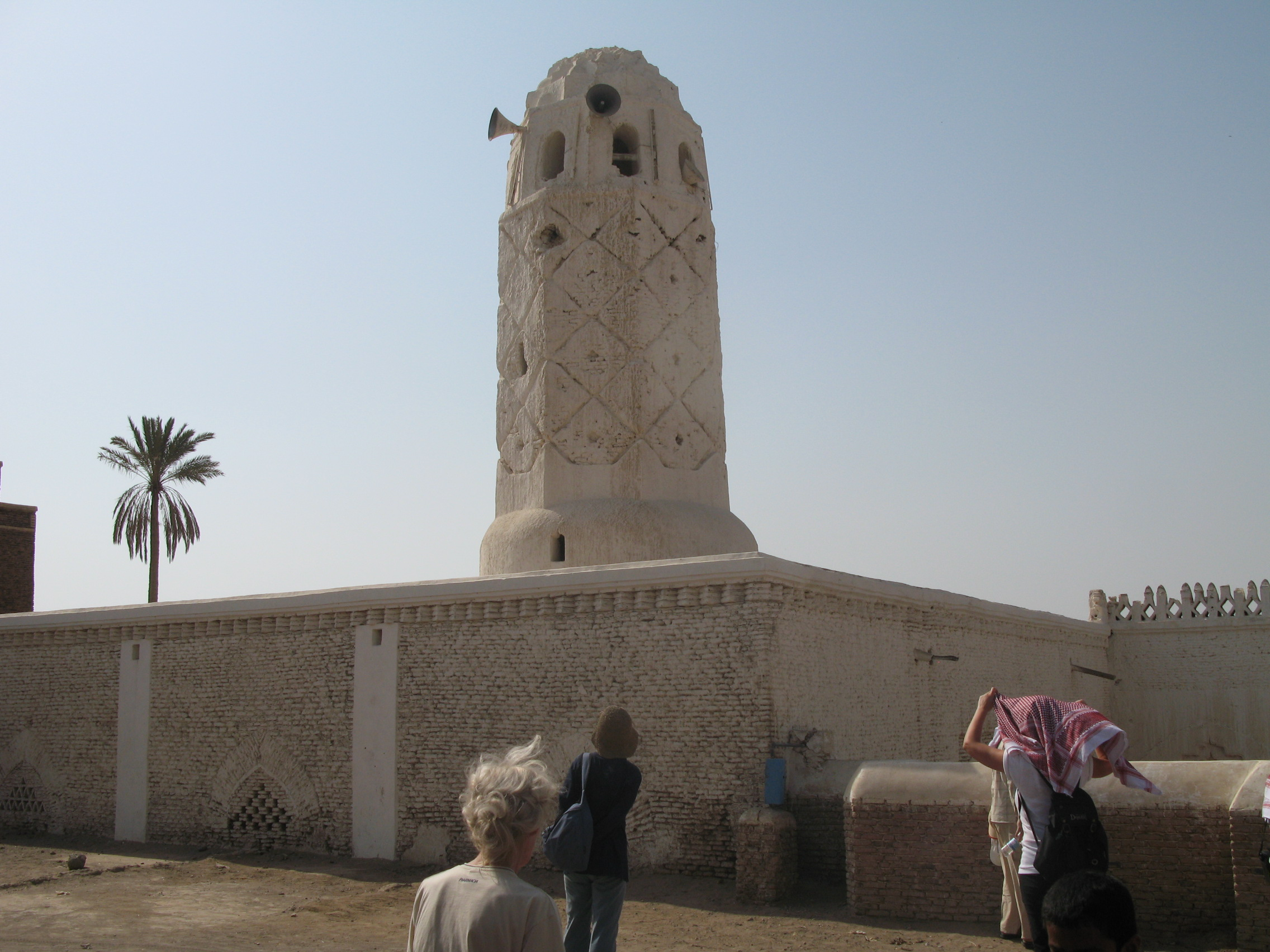
Al-Asha'ir Mosque, built by the late Ziyadid ruler al-Husayn ibn Salamah (r. 983–1012)

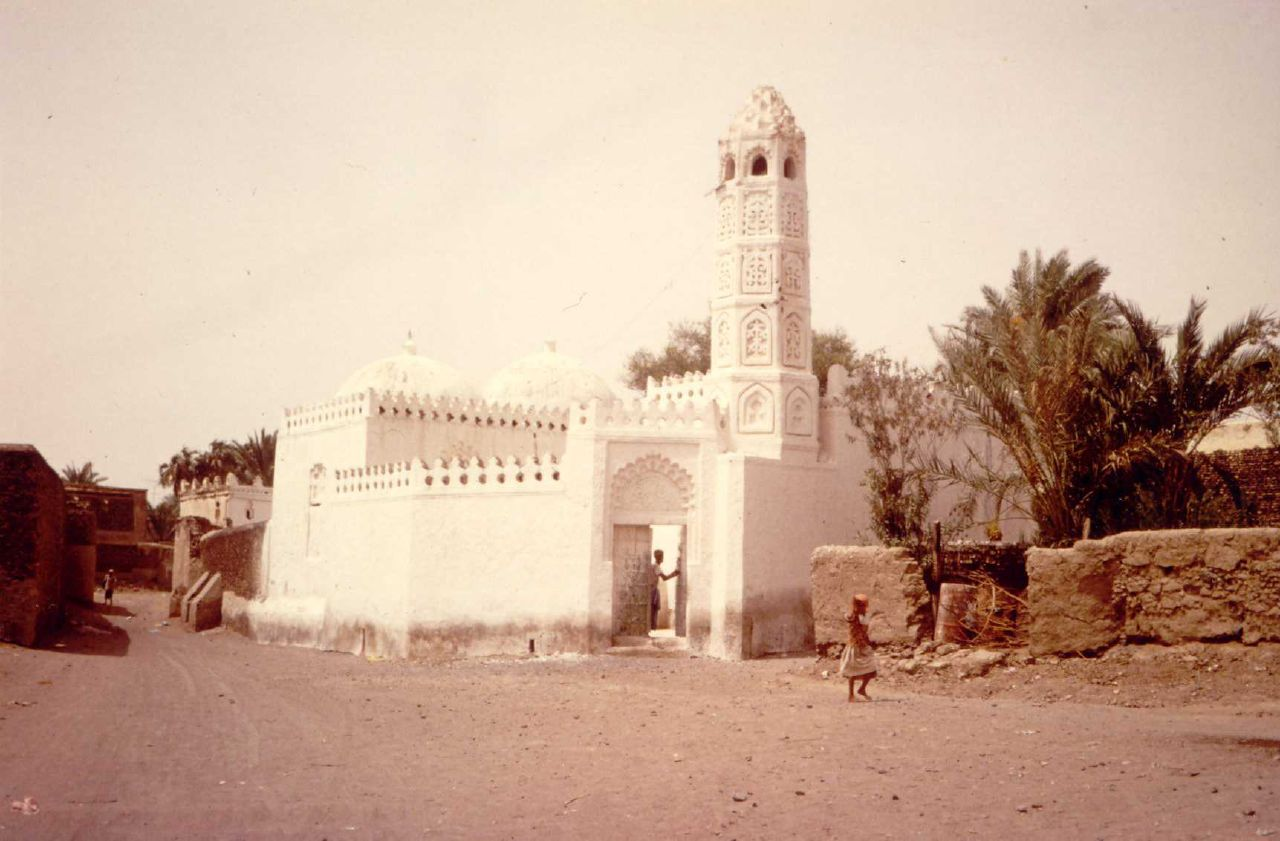
Al-Duwaydar Mosque, built in 1323 by a scholar or Rasulid official

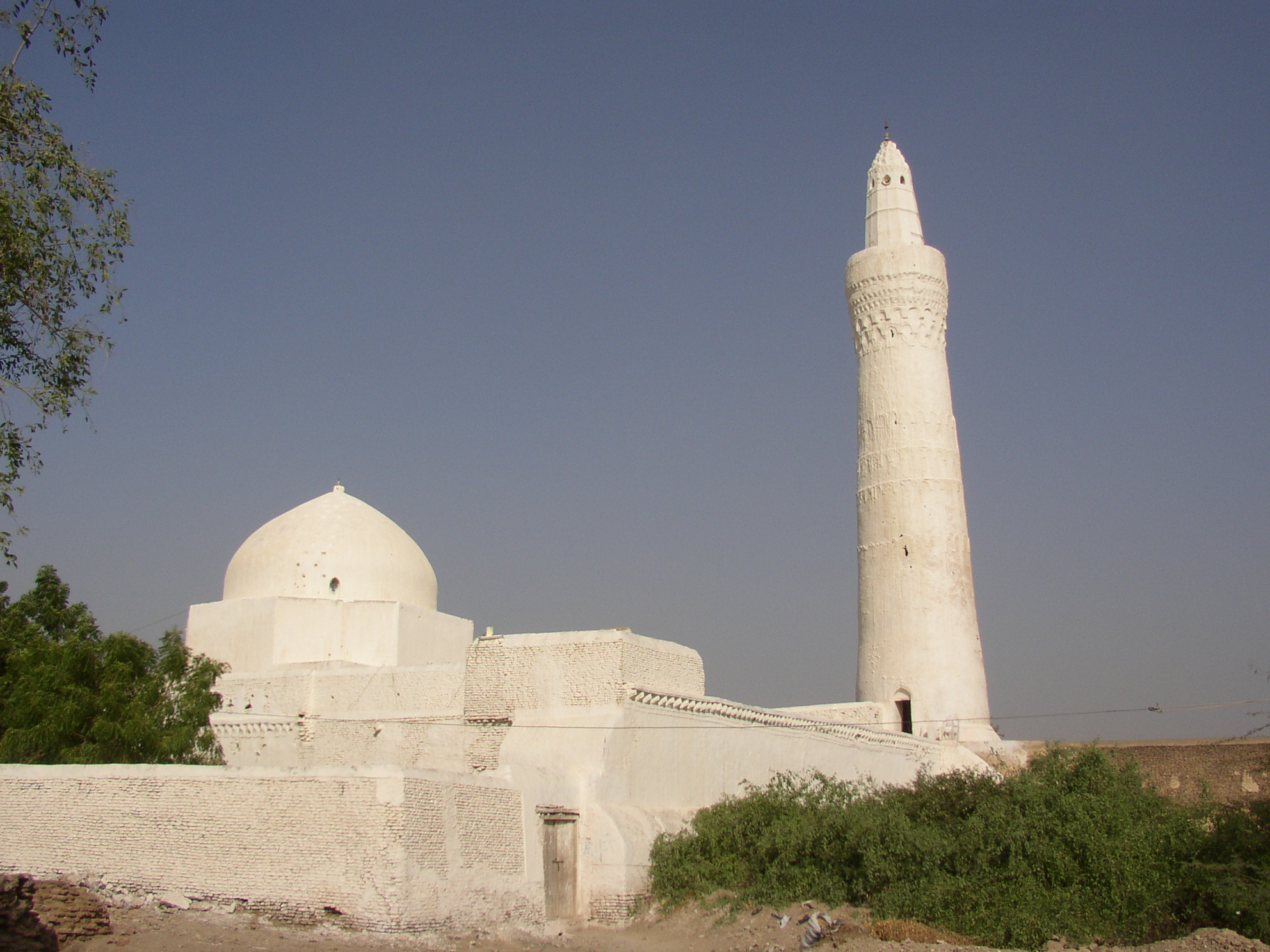
Al-Iskandariya Mosque or Citadel Mosque, attributed to Iskandar Mawz (r. 1531–1536), but possibly older

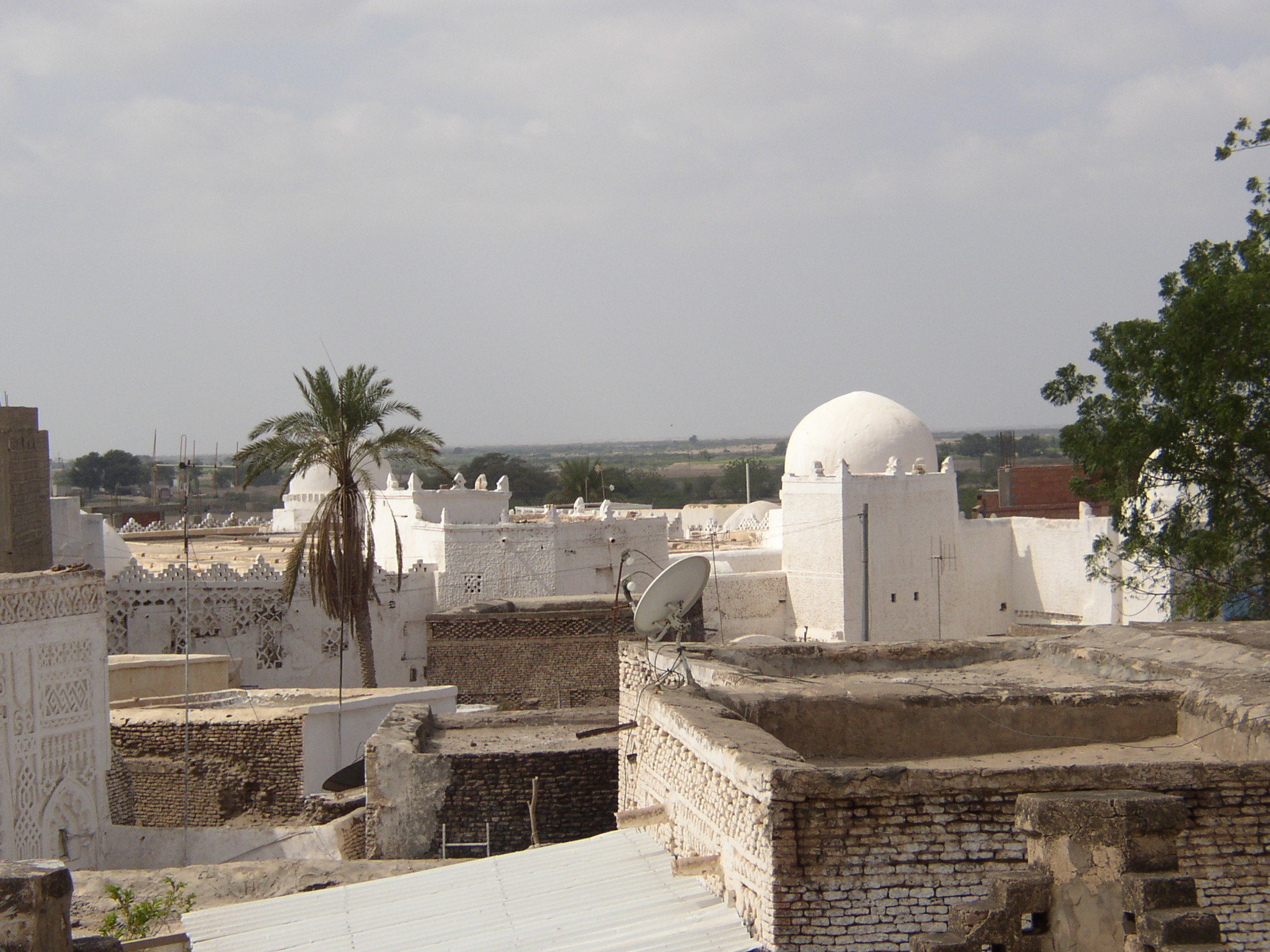
Al-Kamiliya Mosque
