= List of mosques in Taiz =

List of Mosques in Taiz
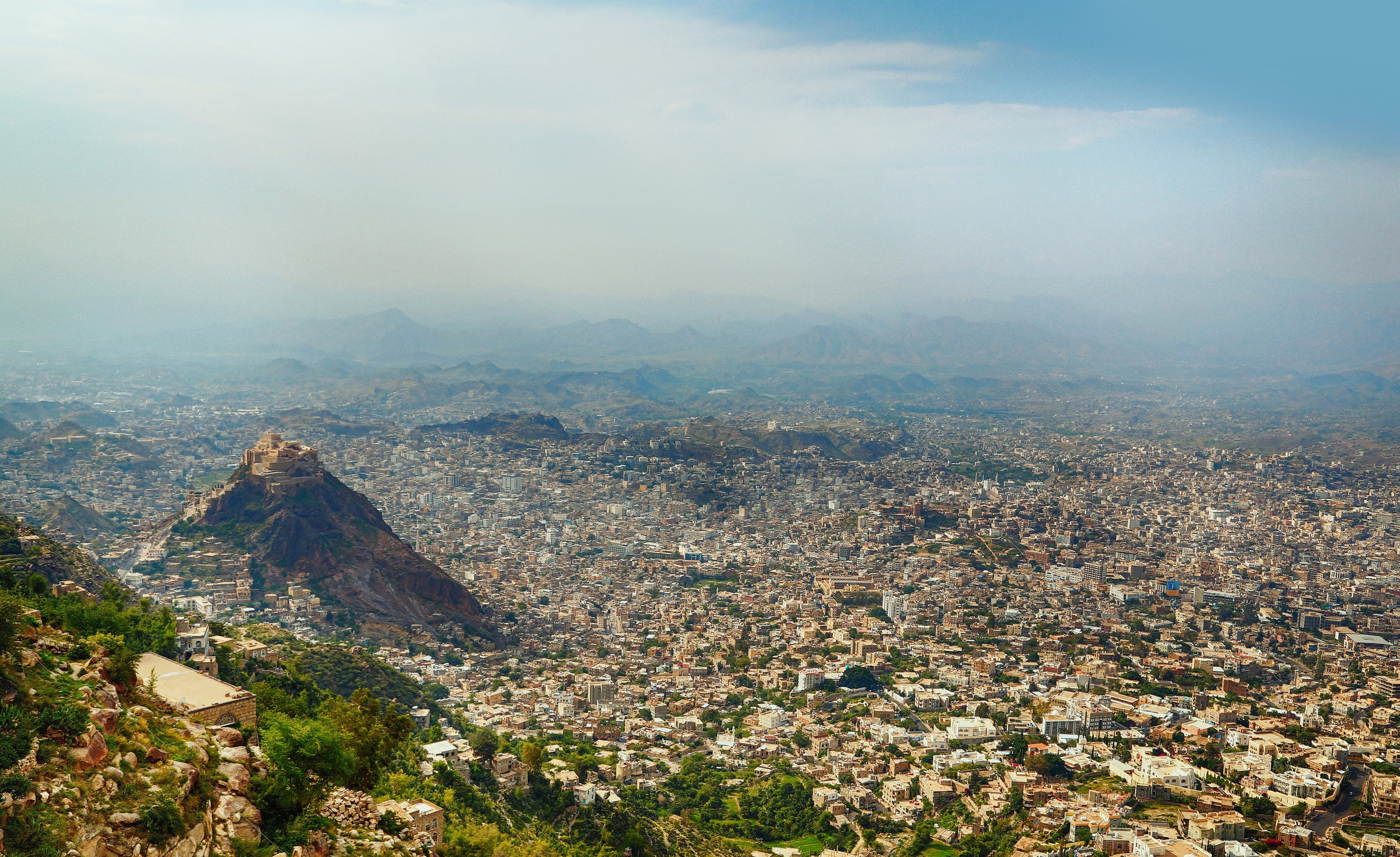
- A view of Islamic architecture in Taiz city, Yemen

The List of mosques in Taiz is a documentary record of the religious and architectural landmarks in Taiz Governorate. The governorate is home to the Al-Janad Mosque, which was built by the companion Mu'adh ibn Jabal by order of the Prophet Muhammad in the 6th year of the Hijra (627 AD), and is considered the oldest mosque built in Yemen.

The list also includes numerous historical mosques built during successive eras, particularly during the reign of the Rasulid dynasty, which took the city of Taiz as its capital. This period witnessed an architectural boom represented by the construction of mosques and religious schools (Madrasas) that reflect the unique Islamic architectural style of Taiz, distinguished by its intricate stucco and colorful decorations, multiple domes, and slender minarets.

On June 20, 2025, the United Nations Educational, Scientific and Cultural Organization (UNESCO) added the historical landmarks of Taiz City to the World Heritage Tentative List. This inclusion is attributed to the remarkable diversity of its architectural styles, which uniquely integrate local Yemeni designs with Anatolian architectural influences, particularly evident in the construction of domes and vaults.

== List ==
Mosque Name	Image	Location	Coordinates	Hijri Year	AD Year	Notes
Al-Janad Mosque		Al-Janad	13°40′07″N 44°09′59″E	6	627	The first mosque built in Yemen, by order of Prophet Muhammad.
Mudhaffar Mosque		Taiz	13°34′18″N 44°00′38″E	649	1250	Built by Sultan al-Muzaffar Yusuf I.
Ashrafiya Mosque		Taiz	13.569°N 44.009°E	696	1297	Famous for its twin minarets and Rasulid decorations.
Al-Shadhili Mosque		Mocha	13°19′20″N 43°14′51″E	830	-	Related to Sheikh Ali al-Shadhili.
Mosque of the People of the Cave		Jabal Sabir	13°31′21″N 44°02′57″E	Unknown	-	Built in Al-Mi'qab village at 3,000m altitude.
The Great Mosque		Mawza	13.26838°N 43.50902°E	771	-	One of the oldest mosques in Mawza District.
Prophet Shu'ayb Mosque		Mashra'a Wa Hadnan district	13°46′25″N 43°50′47″E	Rasulid era	-	Located in the high peaks of Mount Sabir.
Abdulhadi as-Soudi Mosque		Taiz	13°34′11″N 44°00′29″E	932	1525	Its dome is the largest in Yemen; bombed in 2016.

== See also ==
- List of mosques in Yemen
- Architecture of Yemen

== Sources ==
- Al-Akwa', Isma'il bin Ali (1980). Islamic Madrasas in Yemen. Beirut: Al-Risala Foundation.
