= List of hospitals in Albania =

This is a complete list of hospitals, healthcare centers and clinics in Albania. The country's national emergency line is 112.

== Public hospitals ==
Regional	Location	Web address
Durrës Regional Mental Hospital	Durrës	srd.gov.al
Shkodër Regional Mental Hospital	Shkodër	srsh.gov.al
Fier Regional Mental Hospital	Fier	srf.gov.al
Vlorë Regional Mental Hospital	Vlorë	spitalirajonalvlore.gov.al
Elbasan Regional Hospital	Elbasan	sre.gov.al
Berat Regional Hospital	Berat
Dibër Regional Hospital	Dibër
Gjirokastër Regional Hospital	Gjirokastër
Korçë Regional Hospital	Korçë	srk.gov.al
Lezhë Regional Hospital	Lezhë
Kukës Regional Hospital	Kukës

District	Location	Web address
Lushnjë Hospital	Lushnjë
Kavajë Hospital	Kavajë
Sarandë Hospital	Sarandë
Pukë Hospital	Pukë
Mirditë Hospital]	Mirditë
Tropojë Hospital	Tropojë	spitalitropoje.gov.al
Krujë Hospital	Krujë
Kurbin Hospital	Kurbin
Has Hospital	Has
Burrel Hospital	Burrel
Bulqizë Hospital	Bulqizë
Librazhd Hospital	Librazhd
Gramsh Hospital	Gramsh
Pogradec Hospital	Pogradec	spitalipogradec.gov.al
Tepelenë Hospital	Tepelenë
Delvinë Hospital	Delvinë
Përmet Hospital	Përmet
Devoll Hospital	Devoll	spitalidevoll.gov.al
Mallakastër Hospital	Mallakastër
Kuçovë Hospital	Kuçovë
Çorovodë Hospital	Çorovodë
Kolonjë Hospital	Kolonjë
Peqin Hospital	Peqin

Tertiary	Location	Web address
University Medical Center of Tirana "Mother Teresa"	Tirana	qsut.gov.al
Maternity Hospital "Koço Gliozheni"	Tirana	suogj-kgliozheni.gov.al
Maternity Hospital "Mbretëresha Gjeraldinë"	Tirana	sougjgeraldine.gov.al
University Hospital "Shefqet Ndroqi"	Tirana	sushefqetndroqi.gov.al
Elbasan Psychiatric Hospital	Elbasan	spe.gov.al
Vlorë Psychiatric Hospital	Vlorë	spvlore.gov.al
Central Military Hospital	Tirana	mod.gov.al
National Center for Children's Development	Tirana

== Private hospitals ==
Name	Location	Web address
American Hospital	Tirana	spitaliamerikan.com
German Hospital	Tirana	spitaligjerman.com
Hygeia Hospital	Tirana	hygeia.al
Salus Hospital	Tirana	salus.al
Villa Maria Hospital	Tirana	spitalivillamaria.al
Amavita Hospital	Tirana	spitaliamavita.com
Continental Hospital	Tirana	spitalicontinental.com
ABC Health Center	Tirana	abchealth.org
Poliambulanca "At Luigji Monti"	Tirana	fzkm.org
Gaia Clinic	Tirana	gaiaclinic.al
Endoscopy Clinic "La vita"	Tirana	lavita.al
Acibadem Health Services	Tirana	acibadem.al
San Luca Medical Clinic	Tirana	sanluca.al
Keit Day Hospital	Tirana	keit.al
San Luca Medical Clinic	Tirana	sanluca.al
Hospital One	Shkodër	https://www.hospitalone.com/
Andent Dental Clinic	Tirana	https://andent.al/
