= German Hospital =

German hospital may refer to:

- The German Hospital, Dalston, a former hospital in London, near Fassett Square
- German Hospital in Tirana, a hospital in Tirana, Albania
- Taksim German Hospital, a hospital in Istanbul, Turkey
- Yemen German Hospital, a hospital in Sana'a, Yemen
- Lenox Hill Hospital in Manhattan, New York City, whose original name was "German Hospital" and then "German Hospital and Dispensary"

== See also ==
- List of hospitals in Germany
