= Alansar Mosque =

Mosque in Sana'a, Yemen

- مسجد الأنصار
- Yemen

Religion
- Affiliation: Islam
- Branch/tradition: Sunni

Location
- Location: Sana'a, Yemen
- Interactive map of Alansar Mosque
- Coordinates: 15°20′21″N 44°12′29″E

Architecture
- Type: Mosque

Alansar Mosque (Arabic: مسجد الأنصار) is a mosque in Sana'a, Yemen. It lies to the southwest of Albolaily Mosque, and Sana'a Fish Market.

== See also ==
- Islam in Yemen
- List of mosques in Yemen
  - List of mosques in Sanaa
