= Talha Mosque =

Mosque in Sanaa, Yemen

Talha Mosque Qubbat Talha
- قبة طلحة
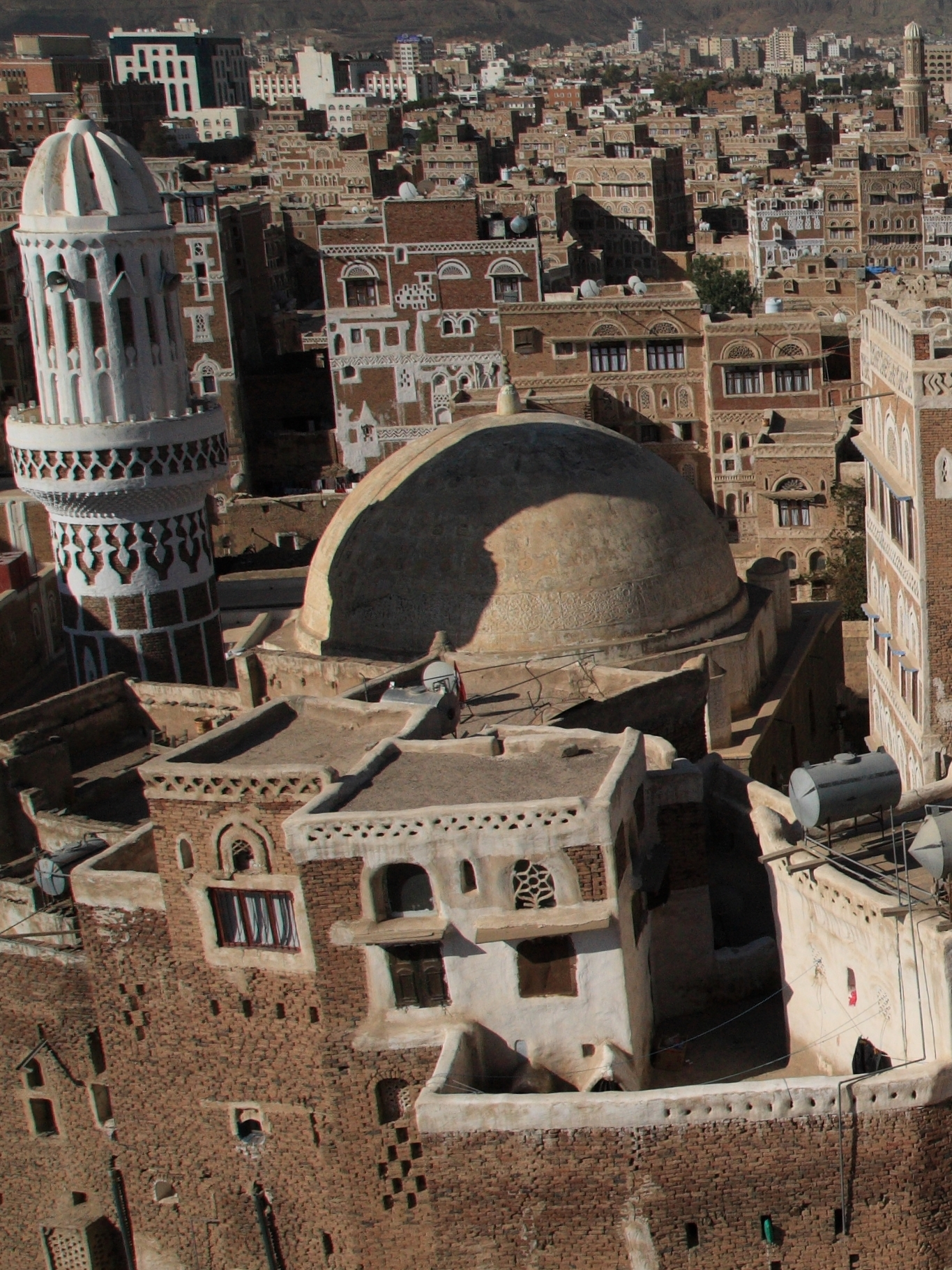

- Location within Yemen

Religion
- Affiliation: Islam
- District: Old City District
- Ecclesiastical or organisational status: In use
- Status: Active

Location
- Location: Sanaa
- Country: Yemen
- Coordinates: 15.3540°N 44.2124°E

Architecture
- Type: Mosque
- General contractor: Ottoman Wali Hadji Mehmed Pasha
- Groundbreaking: 1619
- Completed: 1620
- Minaret: 1

Talha Mosque or Qubbat Talha (Arabic: قبة طلحة, romanized: Qubbat Ṭalḥah), one of the oldest mosques in Sanaa (Yemen), was built by order of the Ottoman Wali Hadji Mehmed Pasha from 1619 to 1620, during the first Ottoman occupation. The minaret was built at the same time.

== History ==
In 1831 and 1832 the mosque was partially restored by order of imam al-Mahdi Abdallah, the son of al-Mutawakkil Ahmad, as evidenced by the inscription in the prayer hall.

The Talha Mosque was built 23 years after the construction of the Al-Bakiriyya Mosque and uses some of the same stylistic features.

Due to the small size of the prayer hall and the short minaret, the Talha Mosque seems quite appropriate to the general style of Sanaa mosques among the narrow streets of Old City District. But, like the Al-Bakiriyya Mosque, it is also an example of Ottoman architecture, successfully combining the different architectural styles of the Ottoman Empire and Yemen.

The mosque is a complex that includes a prayer hall, minaret, courtyard, rooms for bathing, swimming pool and hospice.

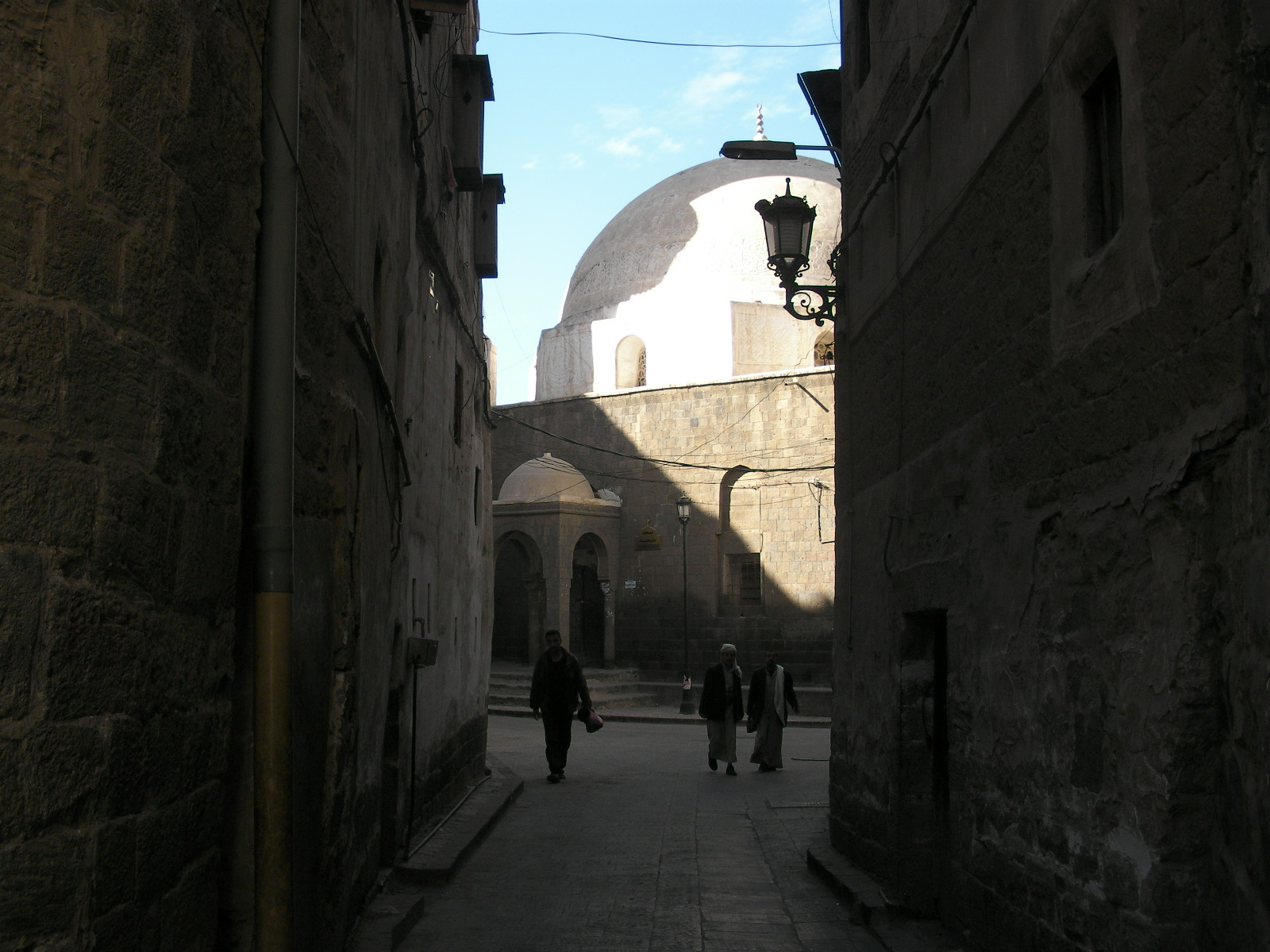
View of the entrance and the dome of the Tahla mosque.

The entrance to the mosque is preceded by a four-dome portico with two arched walkways. Unlike Al-Bakiriyya Mosque, Talha Mosque does not feature additional enlargements (outbuildings). The prayer hall of the mosque therefore forms rectangle.

The semi-circular dome of the prayer hall is decorated with stucco and rests on an octagonal drum, surrounded by four octagonal corner towers, also decorated with stucco.

Each face in the center drum has an arched window that serves as an additional source of light of the prayer hall. The prayer hall of the Talha Mosque does not have the traditional Yemeni mosques wooden coffered ceiling and columns as the square, as per plan, in Al-Bakiriyya Mosque. Support drum and dome at the expense of small-vaulted arched sails.

The minaret is located next to the prayer hall, on the southeast corner. Relatively low, it stands on a rectangular base. Interesting in its own decor minaret. There used rather peculiar favorite decorative motif of Yemen – four-sided diamond (rhombus), which is considered the same protective amulet. Here it is used not as usual – vertically and horizontally around balcony. Under the balcony just as interesting stylized floral motif, reminiscent of sorghum.

Talha Mosque located in the western part of Sanaa, in the Old City District, and often falls into the camera frame. Her short minaret at a certain angle looks like a pinnacle on the dome of the mosque.

== See also ==
- Islam in Yemen
- List of mosques in Yemen
  - List of mosques in Sanaa
