= Al Tawheed Mosque =

Mosque in Sanaa, Yemen

- مسجد التوحيد
- Location of the mosque in Yemen

Religion
- Affiliation: Sunni Islam
- Ecclesiastical or organizational status: Mosque
- Status: Active

Location
- Location: Sana'a
- Country: Yemen
- Interactive map of Al Tawheed Mosque
- Coordinates: 15°20′54″N 44°13′37″E

Architecture
- Type: Islamic architecture
- Completed: 1359 AH (1940/1941 CE)

The Al Tawheed Mosque (Arabic: مسجد التوحيد, romanized: Al-Ṭawāshī Masjid) is a mosque in Sana'a, Yemen. It lies in the eastern part of the city, southeast of Revolution Hospital and Alemaan Mosque, along the E Ring Road. The mosque was completed in 1359 AH (1940/1941 CE).

== See also ==
- Islam in Yemen
- List of mosques in Yemen
