= Albolaily Mosque =

Mosque in Sanaa, Yemen

- مسجد البليلي
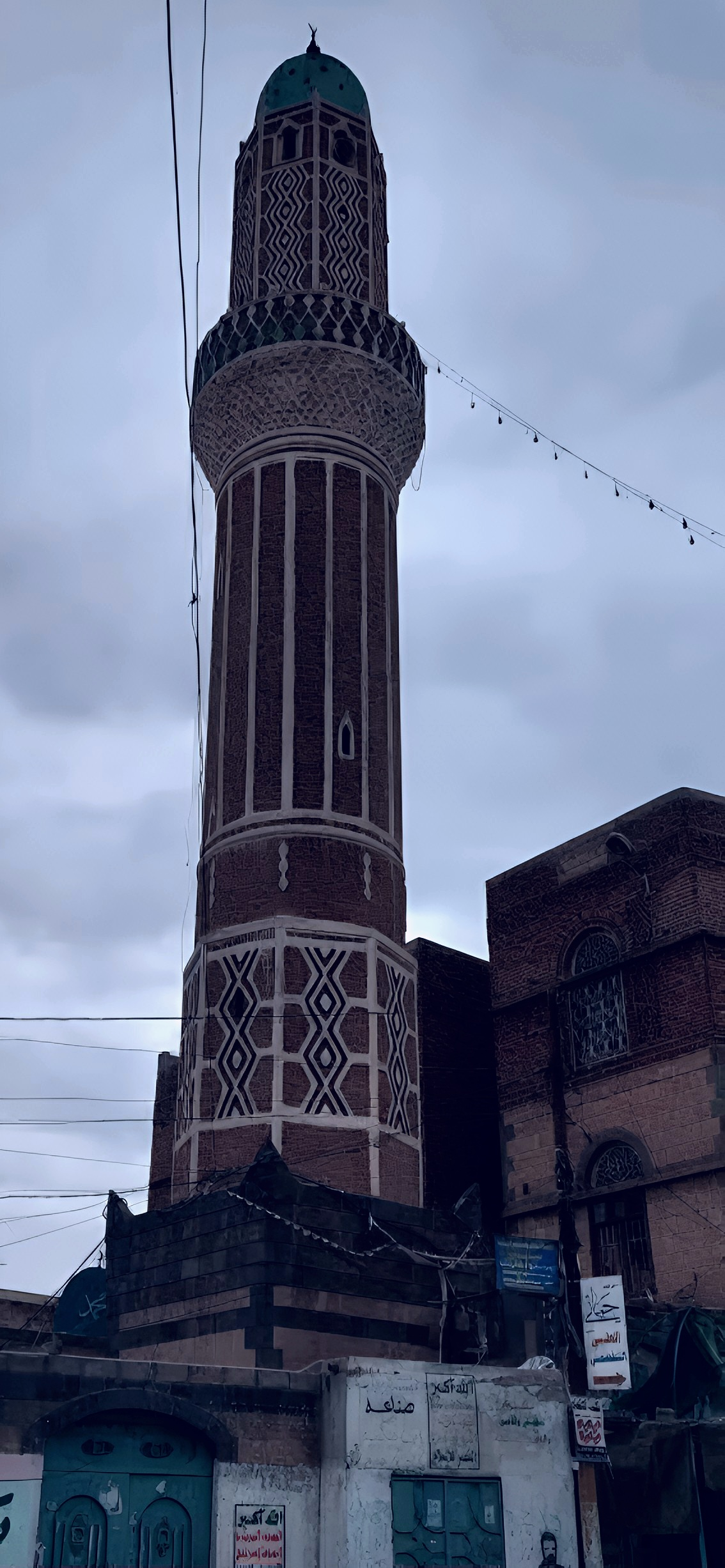
- Minaret of Albolaily Mosque

- Yemen

Religion
- Affiliation: Sunni Islam

Location
- Location: Sana'a, Yemen
- Coordinates: 15°20′31″N 44°12′38″E

Architecture
- Type: Mosque

The Albolaily Mosque (Arabic: مسجد البليلي) is a mosque in Sana'a, Yemen. It lies to the southwest of the Al Shohada Mosque, near Sana'a Fish Market.

== See also ==
- Islam in Yemen
- List of mosques in Yemen
  - List of mosques in Sanaa
