= Alemaan Mosque =

Mosque in Sana'a, Yemen

- مسجد الإيمان
- Yemen

Religion
- Affiliation: Sunni Islam

Location
- Location: Sana'a, Yemen
- Interactive map of Alemaan Mosque
- Coordinates: 15°21′1″N 44°13′32″E

Architecture
- Type: Mosque

The Alemaan Mosque (Arabic: مسجد الإيمان) is a mosque in Sana'a, Yemen. It lies in the eastern part of the city, southeast of Revolution Hospital and northwest of Al Tawheed Mosque, near Al Thawra School and police station.

== See also ==
- Islam in Yemen
- List of mosques in Yemen
  - List of mosques in Sanaa
