= Janad =

Janad or al-Janad may refer to:

- Al-Janad Mosque, an ancient mosque in Taiz, Yemen
- Janad Region, proposed federal region of Yemen including Taiz and Ibb governorates
- Al-Janad (Taiz), in the Taiz Governorate, near Taiz city in Yemen. The Al-Janad Mosque (also called the Mu'adh Mosque) is located there

== See also ==
- Jund village (Taiz), located in Maqbanah District near Taiz in Yemen
