= Yemen German Hospital =

Geography
- Location: Sana'a, Yemen
- Coordinates: 15°19′8″N 44°11′59″E

Links
- Lists: Hospitals in Yemen

Yemen German Hospital is a hospital in Sana'a, Yemen. It is located in the south of the city, southwest of Al Sabeen Maternal Hospital and immediately south of Fun City along the 60 meters (70 yards) road and Hadda Street.

== See also ==
- List of hospitals in Yemen
