= List of hospitals in Yemen =

The following is a list of hospitals in Yemen. Notable hospitals are listed, including name, address, city and references. Links to articles in Wikipedia are included when they exist.

== Notable hospitals ==
List of Hospitals in Yemen
Name	Address Coordinates	City	References
Queen Elizabet II Hospital (Aljomhouria)	Khur Maksar	Aden	
Zabid Axial Hospital	College street, Zabid	Hodeidah	1
Friendship Hospital (Assdaqa)	Shiek Othman	Aden	
Aden General Hospital	Sira St, Crater,	Aden	
Buraihi International Hospital	Caltex, Mansoura	Aden	
Basuhaib Military Hospital	Tawahi12.785258°N 44.981146°E	Aden	
Al-Jomhouri Hospital	Al Mahweet	Sana'a	
Al Sabeen Maternal Hospital	15°19′48″N 44°12′25″E	Sana'a	
Saber Hospital, Al Manssora	P.O. Box 14055; 12.854043°N 44.990602°E	Aden	
Al-Salaam Hospital	Jamal St. 14.786462°N 42.955554°E	Hodeidah	
Al-Thawrah		Hodeidah	
Al-Salaam Saudi Hospital	16.942227°N 43.768067°E	Sa'dah	
Al-Thawra Hospital	Al-Khoulan St., near Bab Al Yemen	Sana'a	
Al-Thawra General Hospital		Taiz	
Marib General Hospital (Army Hospital)	15.460262°N 45.303133°E	Ma'rib	
Hadhramout Modern Hospital	14.549121°N 49.125728°E	Shargh Algwiza، Street, Algwizi, Mukalla	
Ibn Sina Hospital	Zubairi Street15.341253°N 44.168901°E	Sana'a	
Yemen German Hospital (Modern German Hospital)	Taiz road 15°19′8″N 44°11′59″E	Taiz	
Revolution Hospital	15°21′3″N 44°13′15″E	Sanaa	
Yemen-Sweden Children's Hospital		Taiz	
Yemen German Hospital	Hadda Road Near 60-Meter Road; 15.318920°N 44.199225°E	Sana'a	
Yemen International Hospital	13.594374°N 44.036985°E	Taiz	
Kuwait University Hospital	15.361835°N 44.192754°E	Sana'a	
Psychiatric Hospital	12.880114°N 44.985892°E	Aden	
