= Aleksandër Xhuvani University of Elbasan =

University in Elbasan, Albania

Coordinates: 41.122301°N 20.079234°E

Aleksandër Xhuvani University
- Universiteti Aleksandër Xhuvani
- Established: November 12, 1991
- Rector: Prof. Dr. Elvira Fetahu
- Location: Elbasan, Albania
- Website: uniel.edu.al

Aleksandër Xhuvani University is an institution of higher education located in Elbasan, Albania. It is divided into five faculties: Natural Sciences, Humanities, Economics, Educational Sciences and Medical and Technical Sciences. The current rector of the university is Prof. Dr. Skënder Topi.

== History ==
Aleksandër Xhuvani University is a successor institution of the "Elbasan Normal School" (Albanian: Shkolla Normale e Elbasanit), a teacher training institution that was founded on December 1, 1909. "Shkolla Normale" was the first school of vocational education in the Albanian language.

The first establishment of an institution of higher education in Elbasan occurred in 1971 with the founding of the Institut i Lartë Pedagogjik "Aleksandër Xhuvani" (Aleksandër Xhuvani Higher Educational Institute). This institution consisted of several teacher training departments (Albanian Language and Literature, Mathematics and Physics, History and Geography, Chemistry and Biology), as well as Engineering and Economics departments that were outposts of the University of Tirana. On November 12, 1991, the Institute became the Aleksandër Xhuvani University.

The university is named after Aleksandër Xhuvani, an Albanian philologist and educator.

== Rectors ==
- Vasil Kamami
- Hysen Shabanaj
- Agron Tato
- Mehmet Çeliku
- Teuta Dilo
- Jani Dode
- Liman Varoshi

== See also ==
- List of universities in Albania
- List of colleges and universities by country
- Qafa e Vishës bus tragedy
