= Sufyan Mosque =

Historic mosque in Lahij, Yemen

- Arabic: جامع سفيان
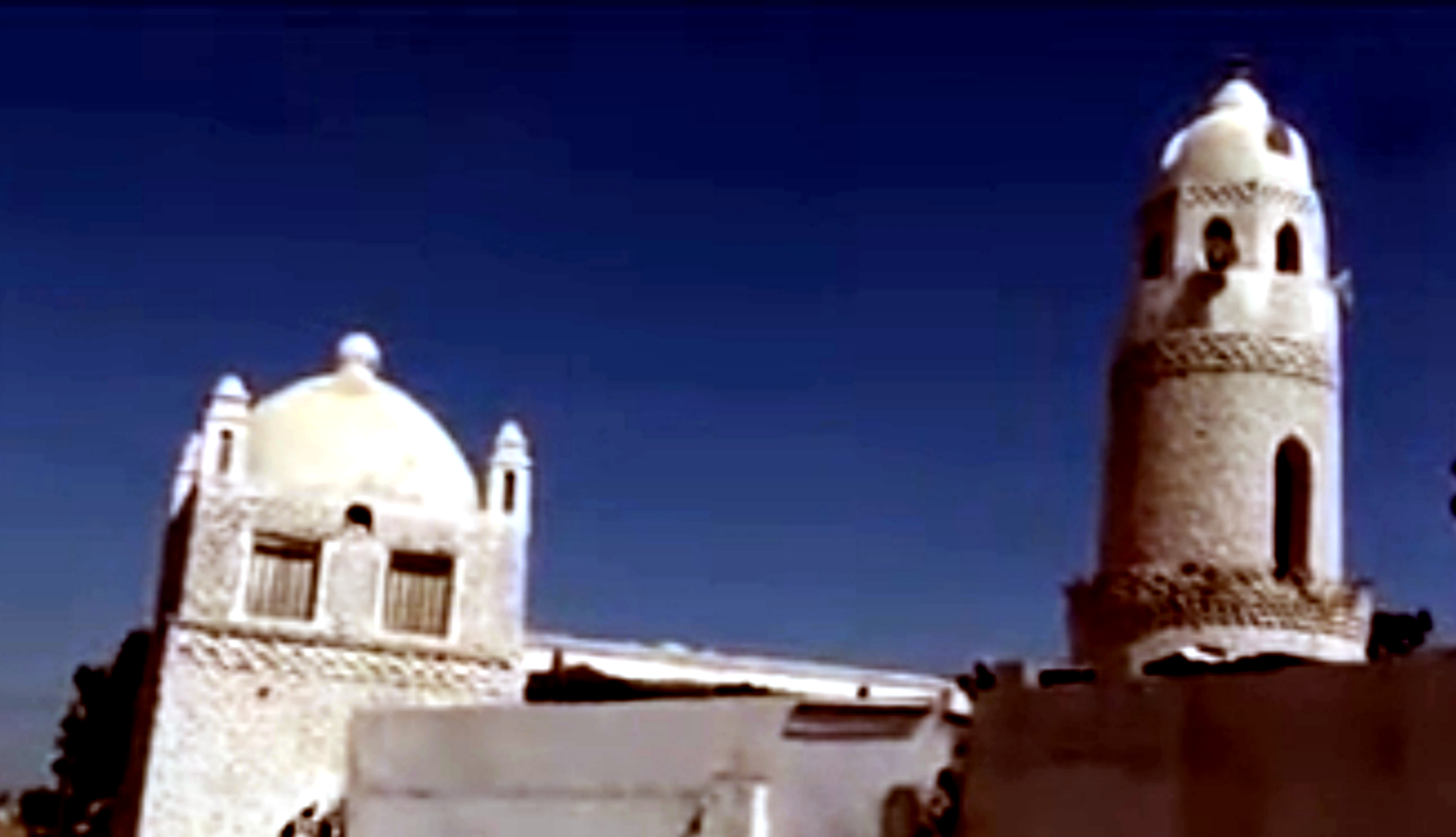
- The mosque as photographed in 2007

- Location in Yemen

Religion
- Affiliation: Islam
- Region: South Arabia

Location
- Location: Lahij, Yemen
- Country: Yemen
- Interactive map of Sufyan Mosque
- Coordinates: 13.0728372°N 44.8880235°E

Architecture
- Style: Islamic architecture
- Established: 1215

Sufyan Mosque (Arabic: جامع سفيان) is a historic mosque located in the city of Lahij in Yemen. It was built in 1215 and contains a madrasa as well as the mausoleum of the mosque's namesake that is attached to a cemetery.

== History ==
Originally, the site was the burial place of Sufyan ibn Abdullah al-Abini al-Yamani, a Muslim scholar who fought alongside Saladin in the 1187 Battle of Hattin. Sufyan died in 1215, and upon his death a mausoleum was built on top of his grave, with a mosque and madrasa next to it. In 1994, the mausoleum and the attached cemetery were destroyed during the Yemeni civil war and did not face any renovations or restorations since then, leaving it in a neglected state.

== 2015 demolition ==
In 2015, it was reported that the Sufyan Mosque was demolished by Islamist extremist groups who planted explosives in the structure. Some news outlets claimed that the grave of Sufyan ibn Abdullah was exhumed and his remains strewn on the ground but this claim was immediately debunked by the residents of Lahij, who affirmed that the militants did not exhume his remains, and that the state of the mausoleum itself had not changed much since 1994. Google Maps satellite imagery shows that the mosque and its madrasa are still intact, while the cemetery is in a ruined state.

== See also ==
- List of mosques in Yemen
