= Al-Mahdi Mosque, Sanaa =

Mosque in Sanaa, Yemen

Coordinates: 15°21′11.1″N 44°12′33.2″E

Al-Mahdi Mosque جامع قبة المهدي
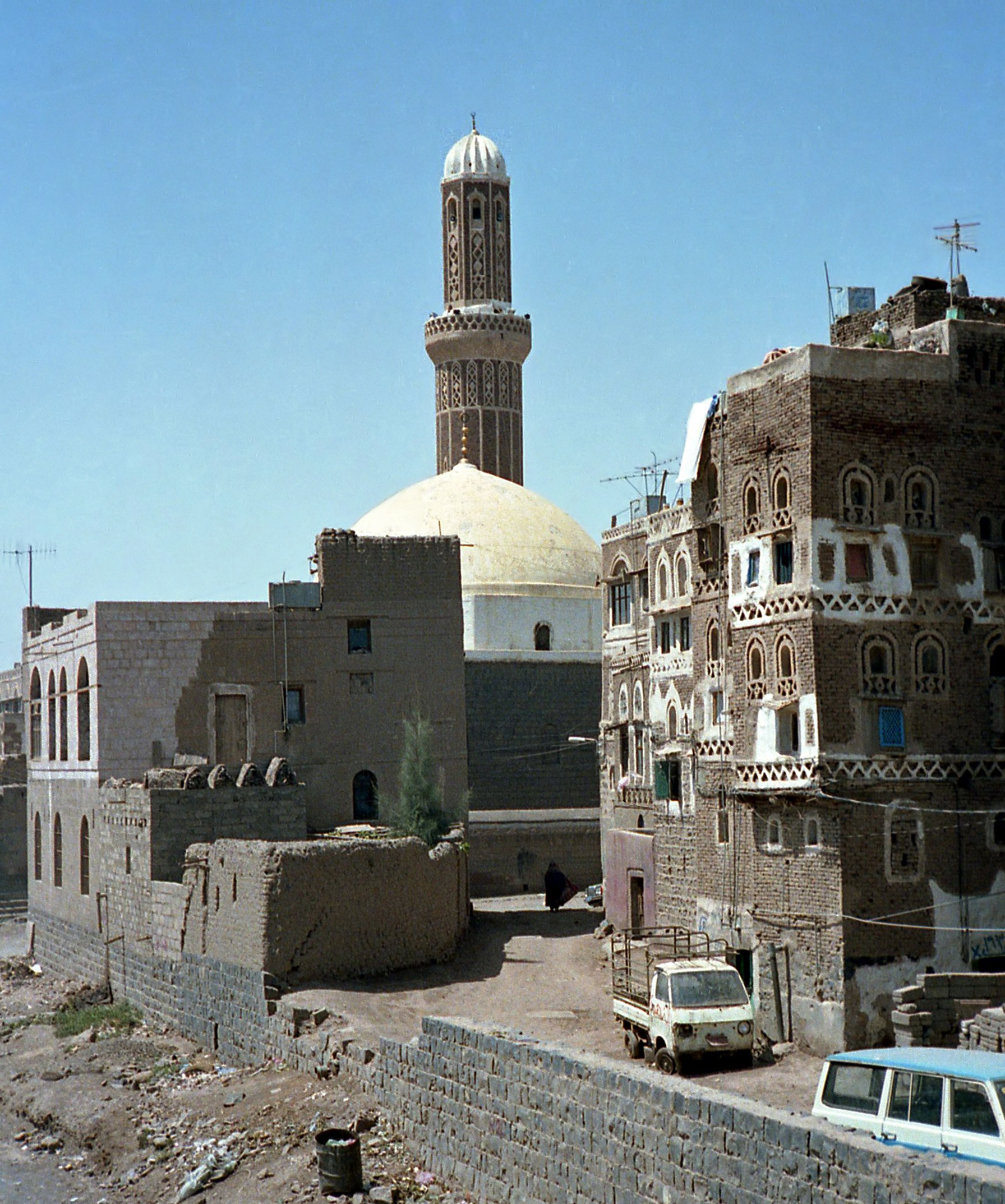

Religion
- Affiliation: Islam
- Region: West Asia
- Status: Active

Location
- Location: Sana'a, Yemen
- Interactive map of Al-Mahdi Mosque جامع قبة المهدي

Architecture
- Type: Mosque
- Style: Islamic
- Completed: 1651

Specifications
- Dome: 1
- Minaret: 1

The Mosque of the Dome of the Mahdi or Al-Mahdi Mosque (Arabic: جامع قبة المهدي) is one of the historical mosques in the historic old city of Sana'a, Yemen. It forms a part of UNESCO World Heritage Site Old City of Sana'a. It is located in the Al-Kareem Al-Mahdi neighborhood in the western Sarar district. It was built in 1651 by the order of Imam Mahdi Abbas bin Mansour. The tomb was built after the death of Imam Mahdi Abbas in 1768.

== See also ==
- List of mosques in Sanaa
- List of mosques in Yemen
