= Hanzal Mosque =

Mosque in Sanaa, Yemen

- مسجد حنظل
- Yemen

Religion
- Affiliation: Islam
- Branch/tradition: Sunni

Location
- Location: Sana'a, Yemen
- Coordinates: 15°21′10″N 44°11′57″E

Architecture
- Type: Mosque
- Style: Yemeni Islamic

Specifications
- Direction of façade: Qibla
- Dome: 1
- Minaret: 1

The Hanzal Mosque (Arabic: مسجد حنظل) is a mosque in Sana'a, Yemen. It is the second oldest mosque in Sana'a after the Great Mosque. Until the late 1950s, Hanzal Mosque and the Great Mosque were where most of Sanaa's residents went for Friday prayers. It lies near to the Al-Tahrir Square.

== Design ==
The mosque is in central Sanaa, near Al-Tahrir Square. It is a simple stone building with a small dome. The interior has an open layout, with carpeted prayer areas and soft light from small windows.

== History ==
Hanzal Mosque, also listed as Hanthel Mosque, is a Sunni mosque in the city of Sana'a, in Yemen's Sana'a Governorate. It serves as a welcoming space for the local community, and its services are held in Arabic. The year it was established is not documented. Little is recorded about the mosque's history, architecture or activities. The details here come from a community maintained mosque directory.

It remained most visited Mosque along with the Great Mosque till 1950s, were where most of Sanaa's residents went for Friday prayers. The courtyard at the mosque's entrance, as observed by Trevor Marchand, was repaved with new habash stone under the direction of Husayn al-Maswari, a mason, during fieldwork in Sana'a.

== Facilities ==
The mosque provides wudu (ablution) facilities and a restroom, although a shower may not be available. Women have a separate prayer space with their own wudu area and restroom which may not be wheelchair accessible. There is no parking at the site. With tenuous mobility, visitors may find access difficult. Directions can be found through online map services.

== See also ==
- Islam in Yemen
- List of mosques in Yemen
  - List of mosques in Sanaa
