= Al-Shadhili Mosque =

Mosque in Mokha, Yemen

- مسجد الشاذلي
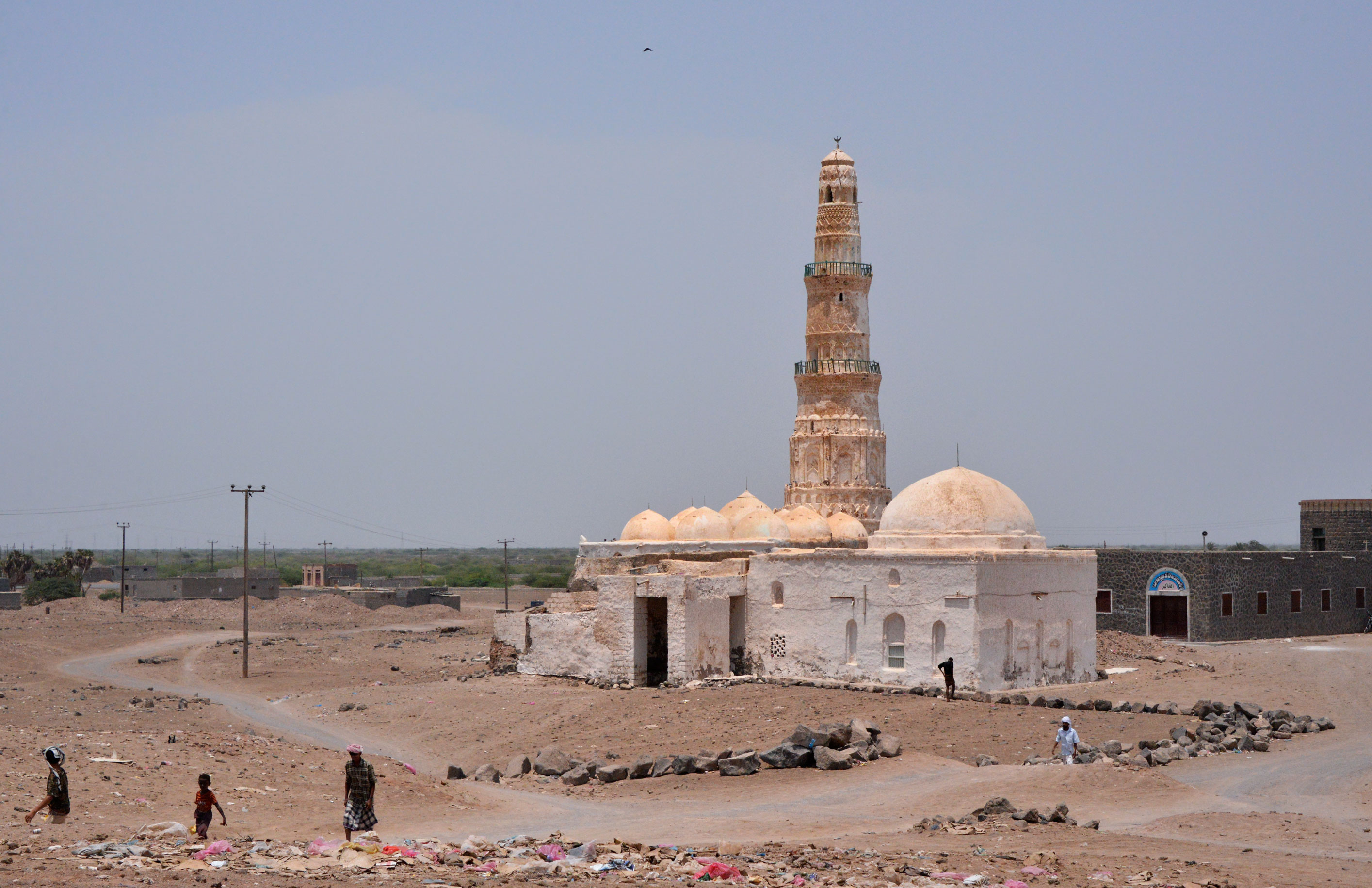

- Location within Yemen

Religion
- Affiliation: Islam

Location
- Location: Mokha
- Country: Yemen
- Interactive map of Al-Shadhili Mosque

Architecture
- Type: Mosque
- Style: Islamic architecture
- Founder: Ali ibn Umar al-Shadhili
- Established: 1417–1418 (820 AH)

Al-Shadhili Mosque (Arabic: مسجد الشاذلي or جامع الشاذلي) is a mosque in Mokha, Yemen. Alternatively known as the Grand Mosque of Mokha, it was built by the Sufi scholar Ali ibn Umar al-Shadhili in 1417–1418 (820 AH). According to the mosque's current imam, Nasr Omar Suleiman, it is the oldest continuously used Islamic shrine in western Yemen.

== Shadhili shrine ==
The mosque contains several mausoleums, including those of Ali ibn Umar al-Shadhili and his son. The mausoleum dome was constructed in 1591–1592 (1000 AH) under Ottoman Empire rule. Upon completion of the mosque structure, the Ottomans renovated the mausoleums of al-Shadhili and his son. The domes and mosque structure are constructed from stone and bricks.

== Surrounding impact ==
The Yemeni delegation to UNESCO cited the mosque as a key symbol of the historic character of Mokha's Old City in its June 2025 nomination of Al Mokha City for inclusion on the cultural organisation's Tentative List of World Heritage Sites. The delegation described the mosque as contributing to the city's status as a hub for living traditions, particularly due to its influence on spiritual devotion. It was also described as one of the principal centres for Sufi pilgrimage in the Arabian Peninsula, drawing followers from across Yemen and as far away as India. The mosque is also associated in city traditions as being a conduit for introducing coffee to Yemen from Ethiopia and subsequently throughout the Ottoman Empire and Europe, as al-Shadhili is credited with cultivating the coffee plant locally.

== History ==
The mosque complex has undergone several renovations throughout its existence. In 1591–1592, the mausoleum dome was constructed. A renovation campaign in 1979–1980 restored the mosque's foundations, while expanding its size and elevating its roof. The mosque's upkeep was said to have been neglected during the 30-year rule of President Ali Abdullah Saleh (1982–2012), leading to its physical deterioration.

In 2022, the Mokha District's local council appealed to the authorities in the Taiz Governorate and the World Monuments Fund for immediate assistance in preventing the Al-Shadhili Mosque from structural collapse, in response to the gradual caving of the sanctuary's wooden roof. Later that year, the Yemeni Ministry of Endowments and Guidance commenced partial works, focusing on replacing the roof with a new covering, specifically one designed in the same architectural style, and reinforcing the building's foundations. The renovation works led to a partial closure of the sanctuary to worshippers. The mosque was restored in three phrases, with the final works completed in December 2025, involving a rehabilitation of the minaret.

=== Status during the civil war ===
The mosque was threatened by armed Sunni and Shia organizations battling for control of the city during the Yemeni Civil War in the mid-2010s and early 2020s. According to observers and local residents, these groups' hostility toward the mosque has been partially tied to doctrinal disagreement with Sufi religious practices, especially the veneration of saints and tomb visits, which they consider as polytheism (shirk). In 2017, local residents reported that militants Salafi organisations, as well as Al-Qaeda and the Islamic State's Yemen branches, had attempted on various occasions to attack al-Shadhili's mausoleum.

The mosque was damaged in clashes between Shia Houthi rebels and Saleh loyalist militias for control of Mokha in the mid-2010s. The Houthis held the city between 2015 and 2017. According to local residents, Houthi administrators placed restrictions at the mosque, a policy that was said to be rooted in the movement's opposition to Sufi practices. Following the Mokha's capture by Yemen's internationally recognised government under President Abdrabbuh Mansour Hadi in 2017, with support from the United Arab Emirates, the mosque sustained significant damage from Houthi shelling in an unsuccessful bid to recapture the city.

The mosque's status as a target of sectarian-oriented groups has encouraged leaders of Yemen's internationally recognised government, the Presidential Leadership Council (PLC) successor to President Hadi, to use visits to the site as a means of conveying national unity. A PLC delegation led by Vice President Tareq Saleh visited the mosque in February 2024, during which it pledged to confront what it called the Houthis' "sectarian plans and division". Minister of Endowments and Guidance Mohamed Ahmed Shabiba similarly delivered Friday sermons at the mosque in March 2025 in which he issued condemnations of the Houthis, accusing the group of damaging mosques, promoting religious radicalisation and causing widespread death and poverty.

== Gallery ==
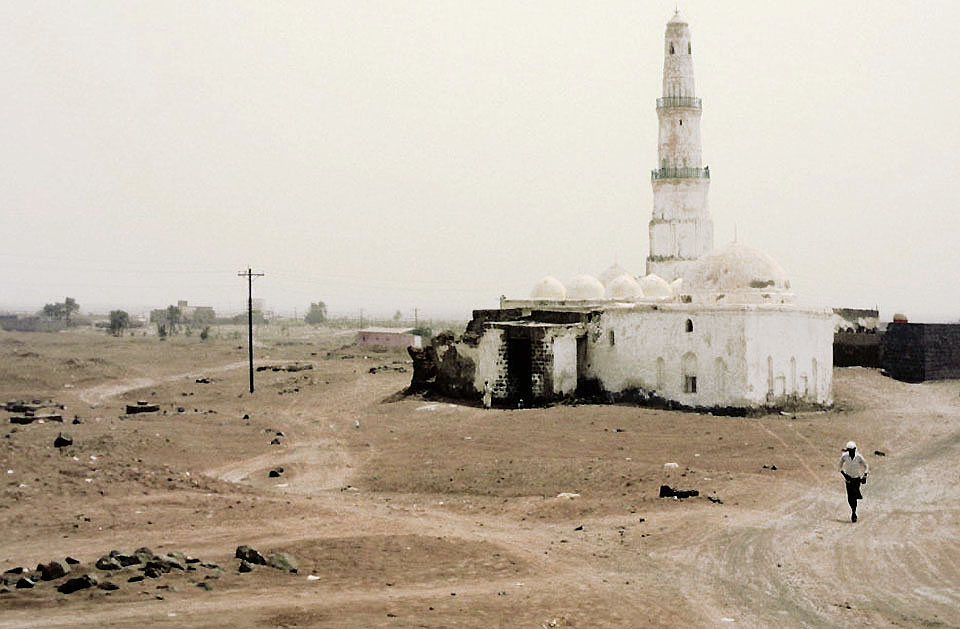

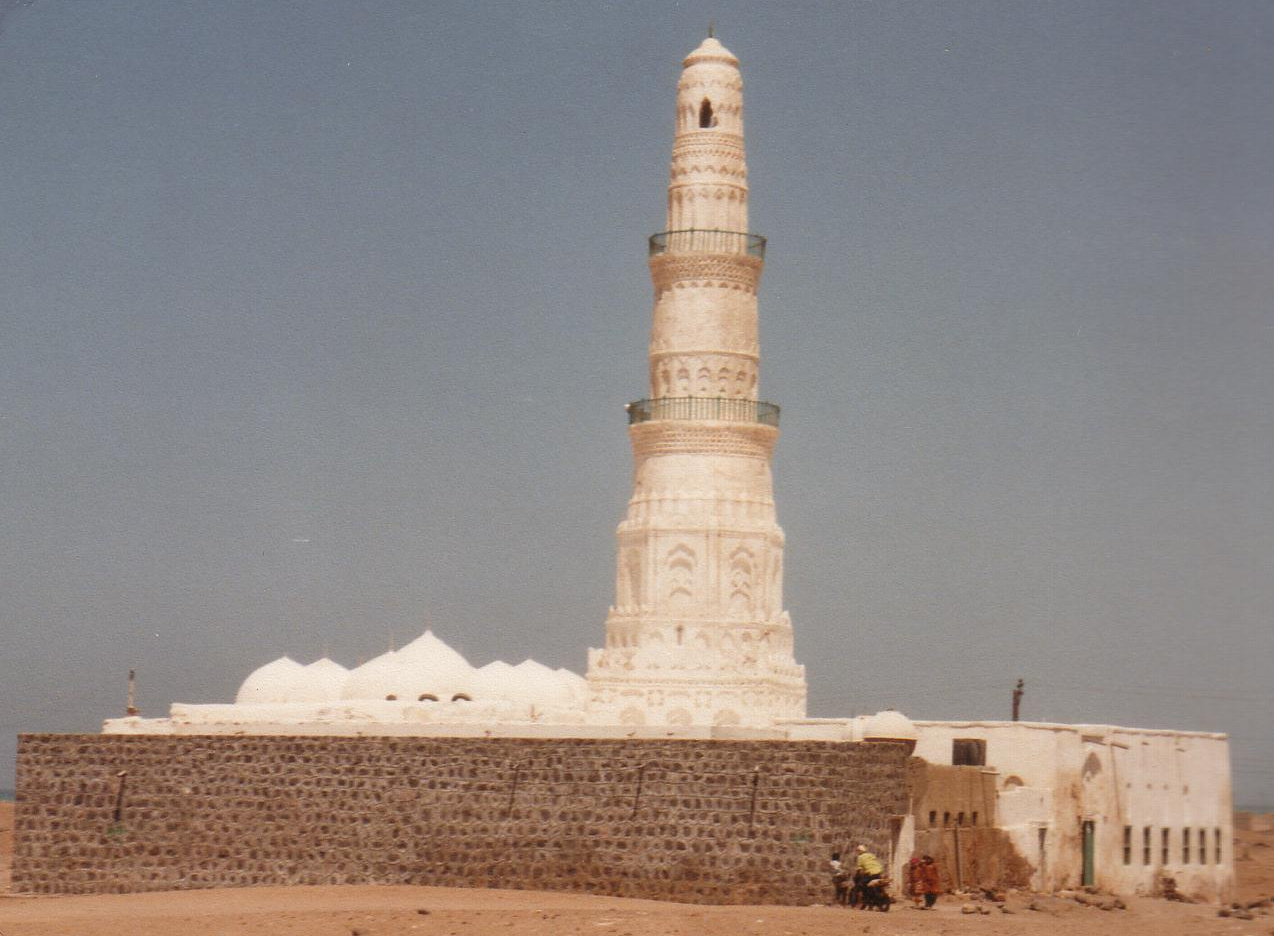

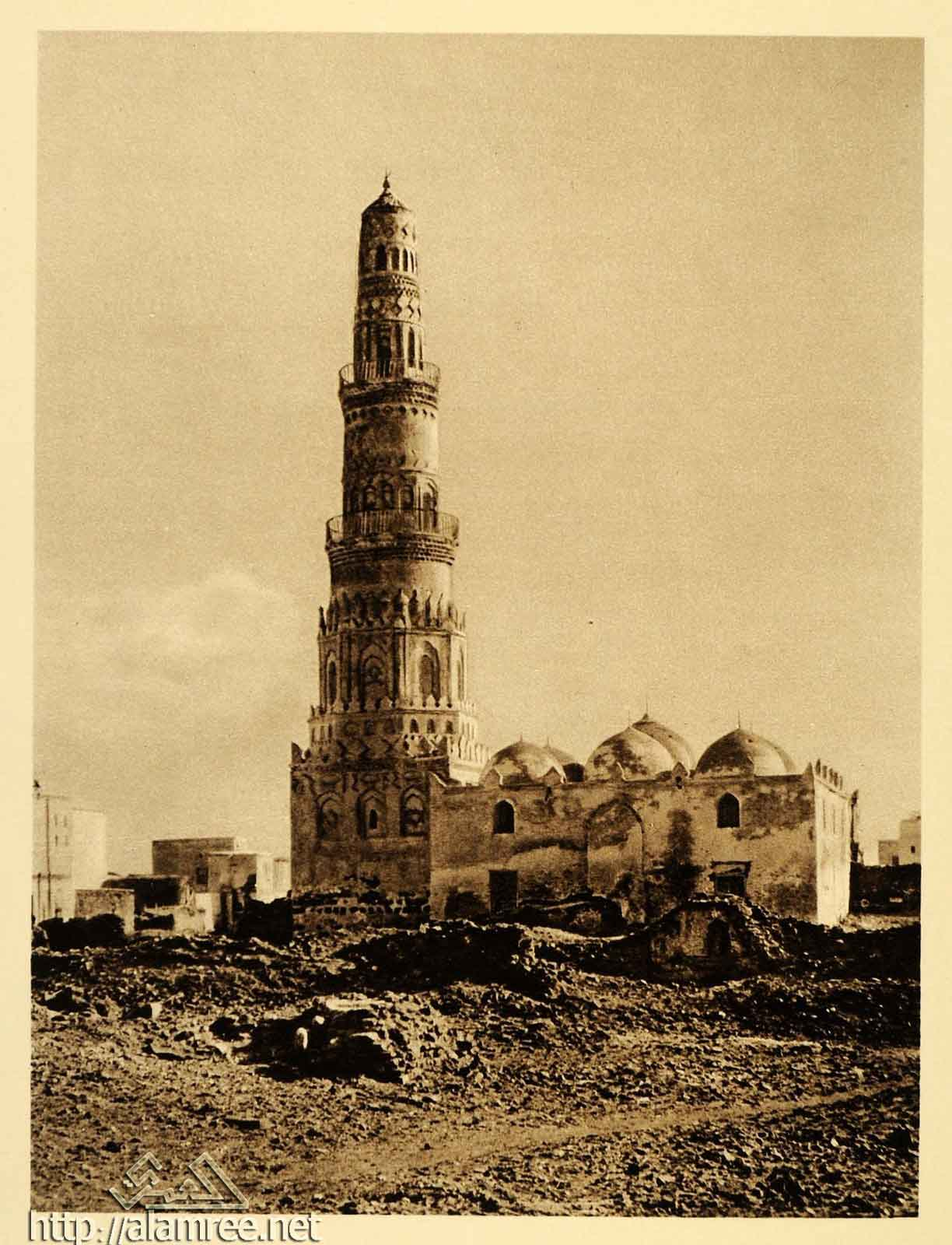

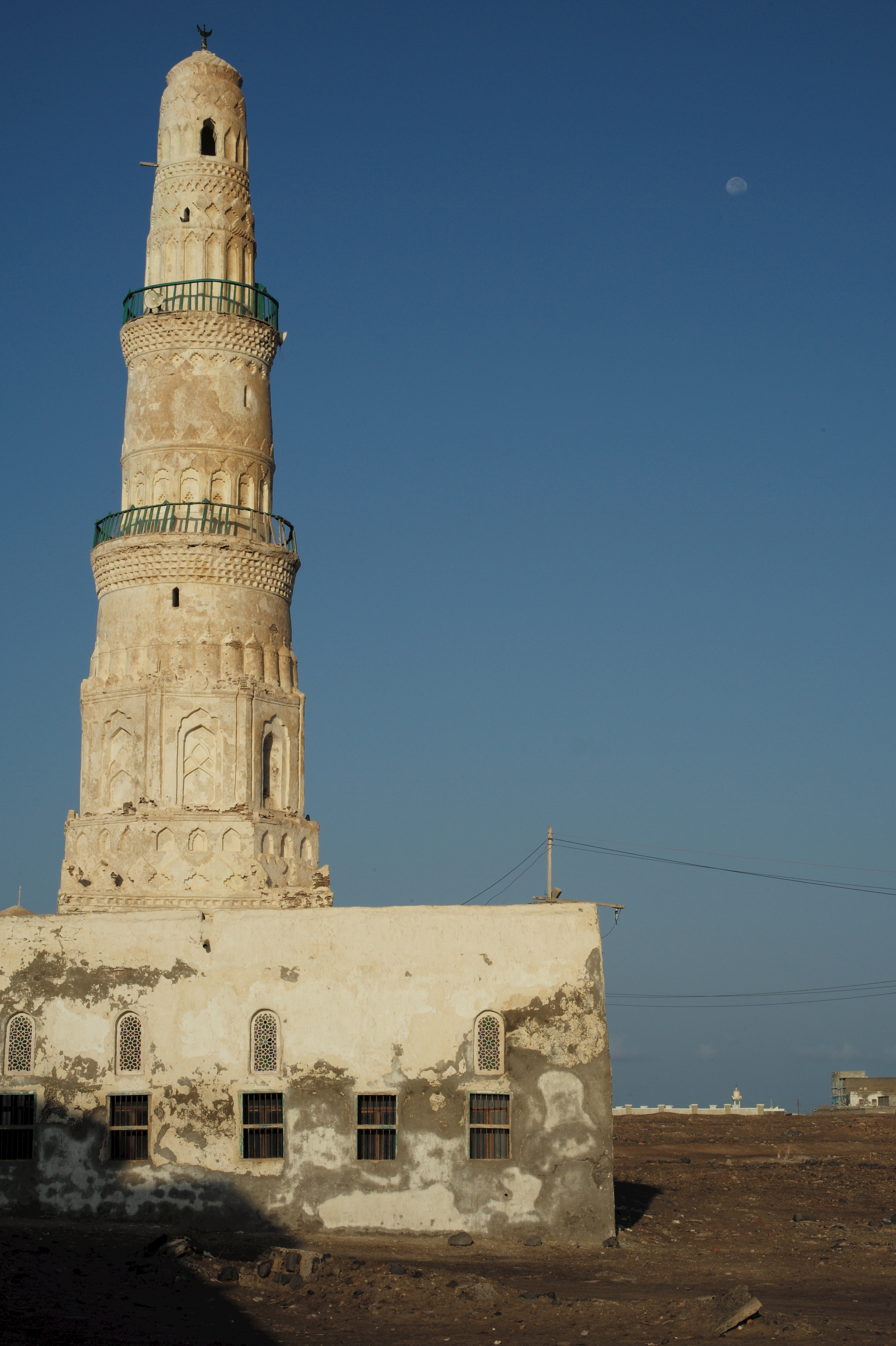

== See also ==
- Al-Janad Mosque
- Mudhaffar Mosque
- Ashrafiya Mosque
