= University Medical Center of Tirana "Mother Teresa" =

Hospital in Tirana, Albania

University Hospital Center "Mother Teresa"

Geography
- Location: Rruga e Dibrës 372, Tiranë, Shqipëri
- Coordinates: 41°20′25.2″N 19°50′04.5″E

Organisation
- Care system: Public
- Type: Teaching
- Affiliated university: UMT

Services
- Emergency department: Yes
- Beds: 1,612

Helipads
- Helipad: Yes

Links
- Website: www.qsut.gov.al

University Hospital Center "Mother Teresa" (QSUT; Albanian: Qendra Spitalore Universitare "Nënë Tereza") is a central hospital in Tirana, Albania. It is currently the largest medical center hospital located in the country and is named after Mother Teresa, who was of Albanian origin. The hospital has a capacity of 1,612 beds and employees more than 2,500 people.

== The compound ==
It is located in the north-east part of Tirana and occupies an area of 165,000 m2. The campus contains nine hospital facilities with a capacity of 1,612 beds and provides medical assistance to the daily average of 400 patients hospitalized.

Yearly the hospital provides outpatient healthcare services to about 150,000 people, hospital care for over 60,000 people and emergency service for about 200,000 people.

== Surgical Interventions ==
The total number of surgical interventions performed during a year is 18,342, of which:

- 1001 Neurosurgery Intervention
- 525 cardiac surgery
- 891 vascular interventions

An e-consultation program was established at the Eye Clinic of the hospital in February, 2002, mentored by the Oftapro Clinic in Bucharest and the Health for Humanity of Chicago from Chicago in the United States.

== See also ==
- Healthcare in Albania
- Ministry of Health
- Tirana Military Hospital
- 2008 Gërdec explosions
- Qafa e Vishës bus tragedy
