= Al-Saleh Mosque =

Mosque in Sana'a, Yemen

- Jāmiʿ Aṣ-Ṣāliḥ (جَامِع ٱلصَّالِح)

Religion
- Affiliation: Islam
- Province: Sanaa
- Year consecrated: November 2008
- Status: Active

Location
- Country: Yemen
- Interactive map of Al-Saleh Mosque
- Coordinates: 15°19′32.88″N 44°12′27.72″E

Architecture
- Architect: Mohamed Abdel-Mo'ez Hussein
- Type: Mosque
- Style: Sanaani Architecture
- Construction cost: 60 million US dollars

Specifications
- Capacity: 45,000
- Height (max): 100 m (330 ft)
- Dome: Five
- Dome height (outer): Four of 20.35 metres (66.8 ft)
- Dome height (inner): One central of 39.6 metres (130 ft)
- Dome dia. (outer): 13.6 metres (45 ft)
- Dome dia. (inner): 27.4 metres (90 ft)
- Minaret: 6
- Minaret height: 100 metres (330 ft)
- Materials: Reinforced cement concrete with local materials

Al-Saleh Mosque (Arabic: جَامِع ٱلصَّالِح, romanized: Jāmiʿ Aṣ-Ṣāliḥ) is a modern mosque in Sana'a that is the largest in Yemen. It lies in the southern outskirts of the city, south of Al Sabeen Maternal Hospital. It was inaugurated in November 2008 by Yemeni President Ali Abdullah Saleh. The mosque, 27,300 square metres (294,000 sq ft) in size, has a central hall that is 13,596 square metres (146,350 sq ft) with an occupancy capacity of 44,000. The building cost nearly US$60 million to construct. Open to non-Muslims, the mosque is frequented by tourists, and promotes moderate Islam. After the Houthi–Saleh split in 2017 that resulted in the death of president Saleh, the Houthi-led authorities in Sana'a announced a renaming from "Al-Saleh Mosque" to "The People's Mosque" (Jami ash-Shaab), and they continue to use this name.

== History ==
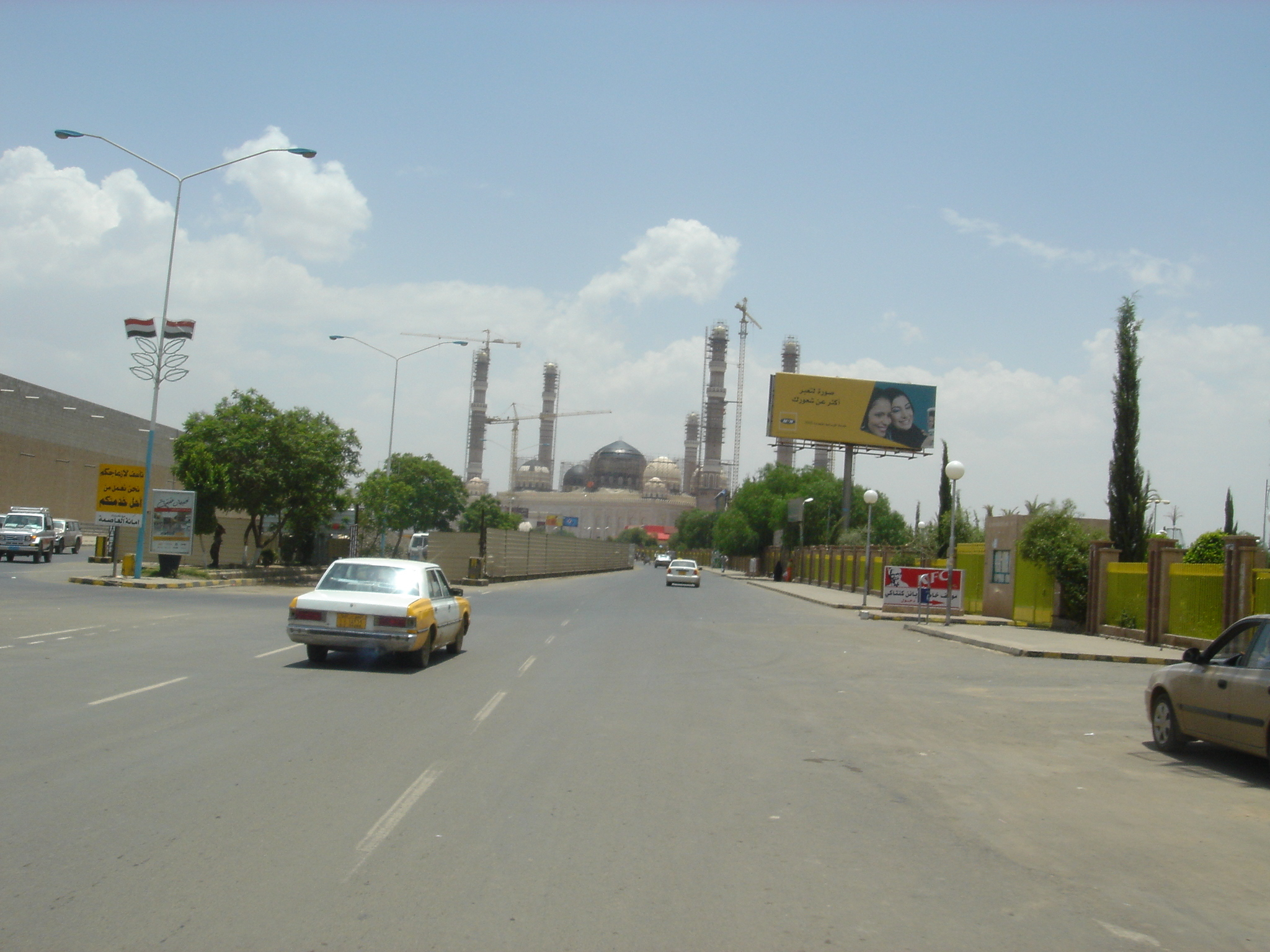
The mosque under construction, on the 19th of August 2007

Saleh was criticized in 2008 for undertaking such a grand project when the country was suffering from socio-economic problems, wherein 42% of Yemenis lived in poverty and one in five were malnourished, according to United Nations estimates at the time. Several accidents occurred during its construction. The minarets collapsed multiple times, resulting in some deaths. After these occurrences, the site was used to build the Islamic college and the garden next to the mosque. It is also mentioned that Hayel Said, a local businessman, was threatened with reprisals and annulment of his business licenses, if he did not pay for the building of the mosque.

The mosque was the site of fighting during the conflict between Houthi and pro-Saleh forces in December 2017. At the time, rumours circulated in Sanaa that the Houthis intended to repaint the mosque's dome green.

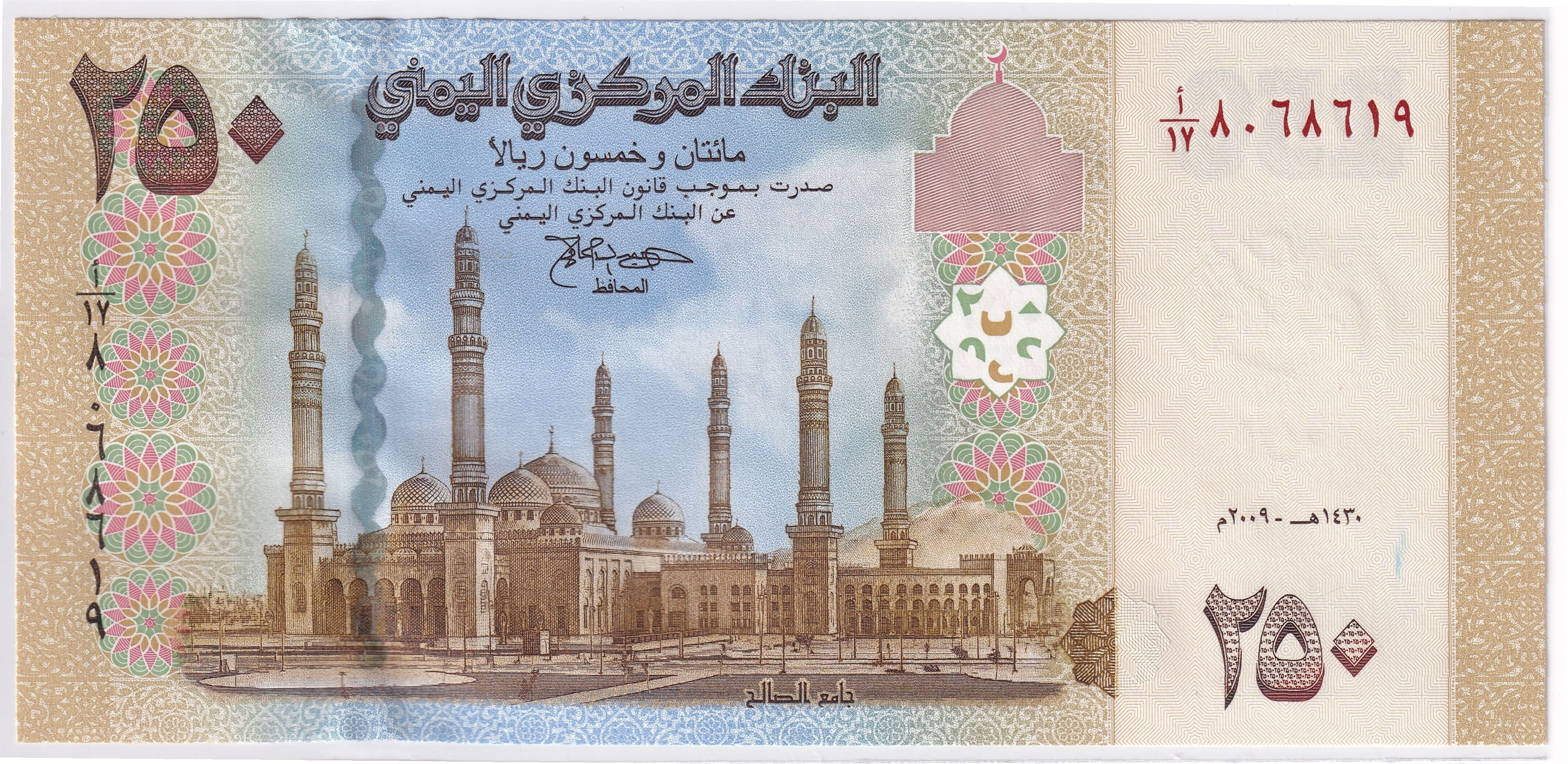
Obverse side of a 250 Yemeni rial banknote showing the mosque

The Saleh Mosque appears on the Yemeni currency. It is depicted on the face of the 2009 issue 250-rial note.

== Architecture and fittings ==
The mosque was constructed using different types of stone, including black basalt stones as well as limestone in red, white and black. The building is compared in its beauty and architectural elegance with the Masjid al-Haram, in Mecca. It was built in a fusion of "Yemeni architecture and Islamic styles", with many Quranic verses inscribed on the walls. The layout is referred to as "Himyarite architecture".

The building has wooden roofs and seven ornate domes. There are five domes in the main roof, the main dome measuring 27.4 metres (90 ft) in diameter with a height of 39.6 metres (130 ft) above the mosque's roof. The other four domes measure 15.6 metres (51 ft) with height of 20.35 metres (66.8 ft) above the roof level of the mosque. Windows fitted with stained glass are locally referred to as qamariyah. Of the fifteen wooden doors, ten of them are situated on the eastern and western sides, and five open south towards the Islamic college and ablution areas. The doors are 22.86 metres (75.0 ft) in height and include engraved copper patterns. Four of the six minarets are 160 metres (520 ft) in height.

The interior space is 24 metres (79 ft) from floor to ceiling. While the plush carpeting contains intricate patterns, huge chandeliers have colorful and flower-like patterns. The three-storied building that includes the Quran College also contains libraries, and over two dozen classrooms, enough space to accommodate 600 students. Three large rooms are specifically for women; a small hall can accommodate 2,000 women.

The mosque has a modern central air conditioning and sound systems, as well as full security arrangements, including bomb-sniffing dogs. The building stays lit through the night. Thorn Lighting International, through its distributor Al Zaghir, was the lighting contractor. Diah International served as the subcontractor for civil and mechanical engineering; Sodaco Engineering & Contracting also provided services in the building's construction.

== Grounds ==
Situated close to the presidential palace, the mosque is set within Al-Sabeen Square, which is the country's largest parade square. The mosque was built on a large area of land that was acquired from Beit Zuhra, a well-known local family; when Zuhra refused to sell the land at a low price, his eldest son was abducted for ransom and released three months later, after Zuhra agreed to sell the land for the mosque at a low price. Nearby is an amusement park named FunCity. The grounds include sprawling gardens, green courtyards, and parking space for thousands of vehicles, part of an integrated services plan.

== Worshipers ==
As people of all religions can visit the mosque, tourists are present in large numbers. The mosque also promotes moderate Islam, to a large number of people, which is considered a positive feature in the light of the influence of Al-Qaeda. Women pray in an enclosed area separated from the main central hall. The Saleh Mosque is the only Yemeni mosque where police and bomb-sniffing dogs are used for inspecting worshippers. Prayers are also broadcast over the national television network to reach a larger viewing audience.

== Gallery ==
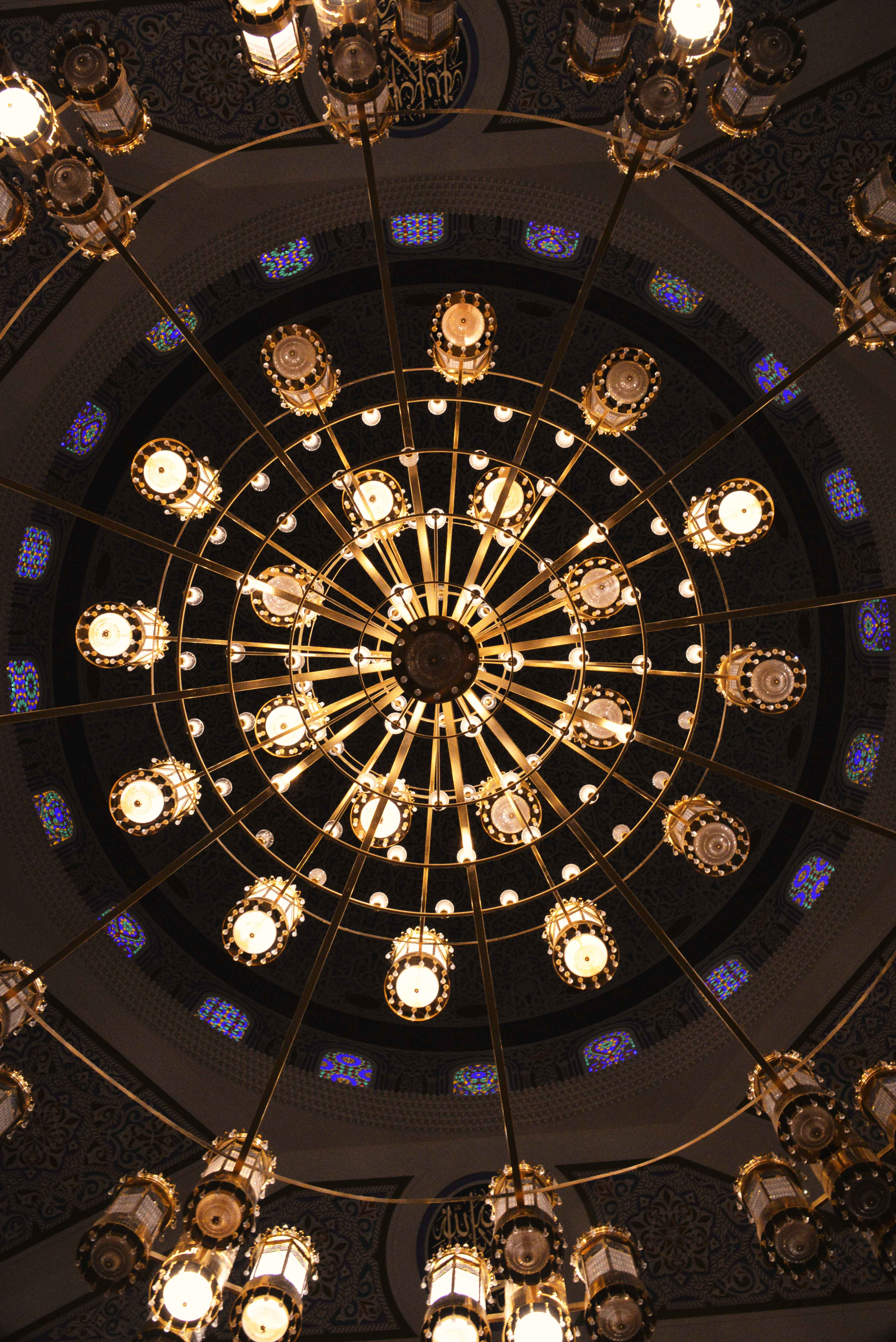
One of the chandeliers of the mosque

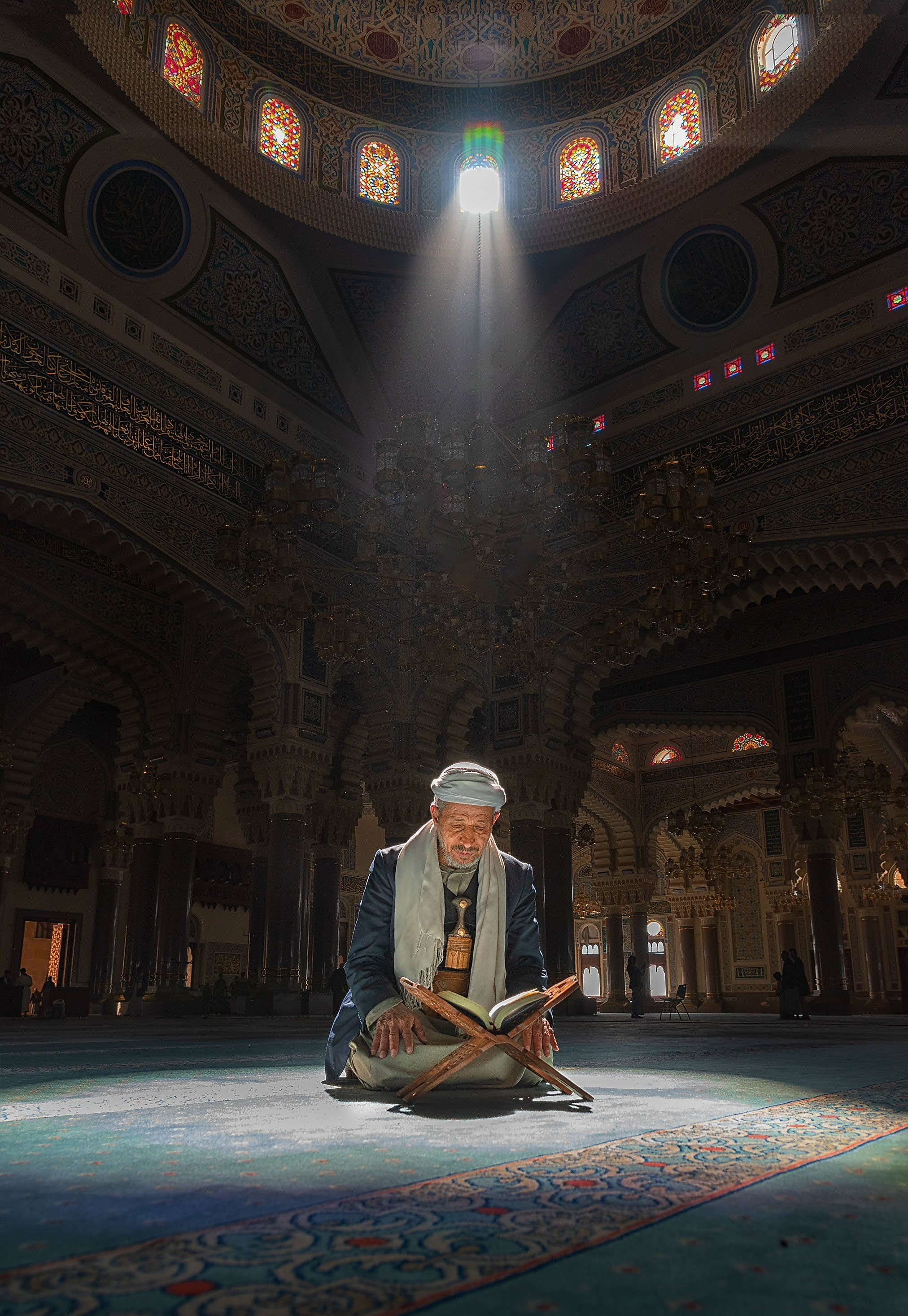
A man reading the Quran inside the moque

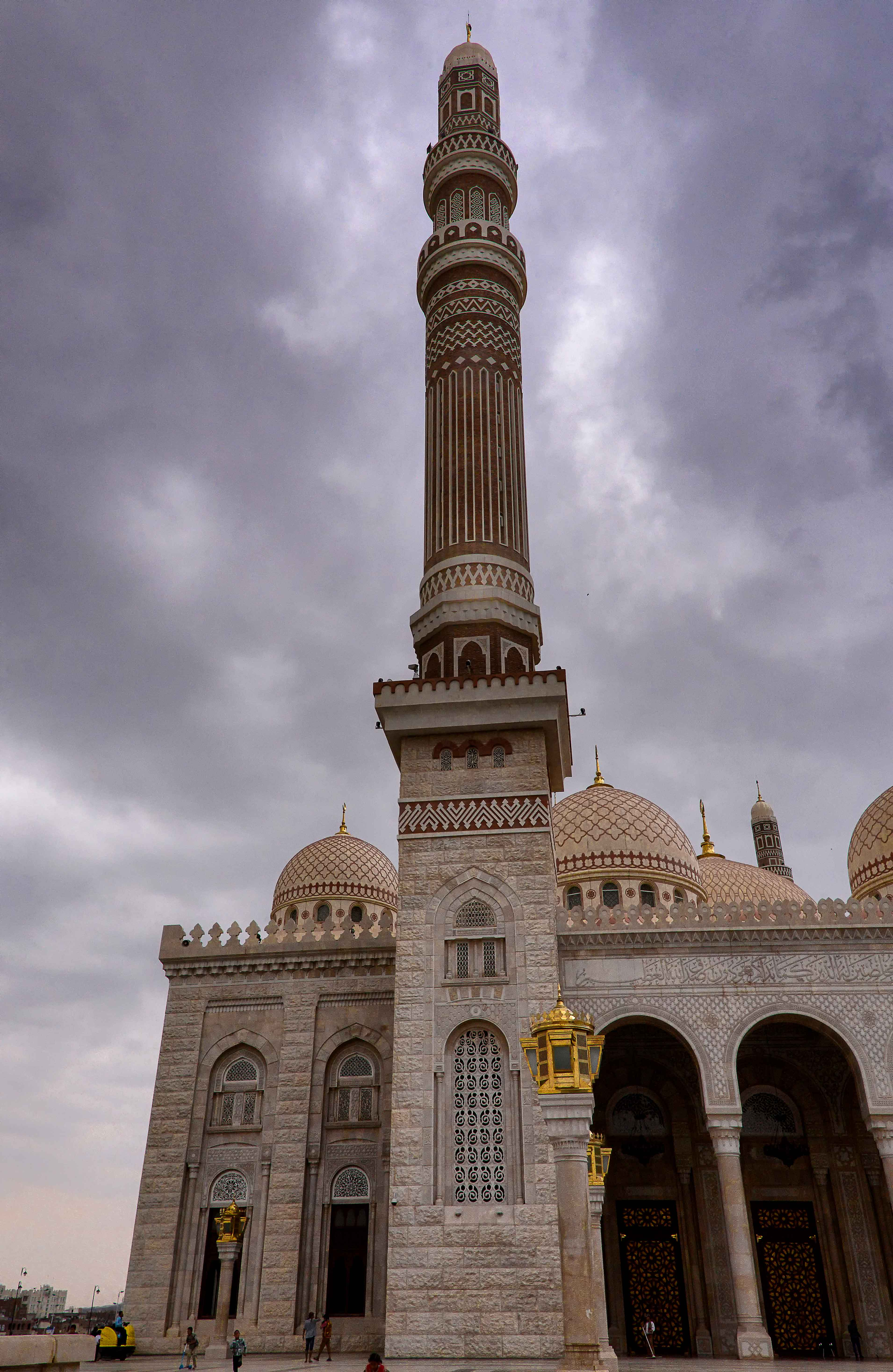
View of one of the minarets of the mosque

== See also ==
- List of mosques in Yemen
  - List of mosques in Sanaa
