= Al-Abbas Mosque (Yemen) =

Historic mosque in Sana'a, Yemen

- مسجد العباس

Religion
- Affiliation: Islam
- Branch/tradition: Sunni Islam
- Region: Middle East

Location
- Location: Asnaf, Khawlan, Sana'a Governorate, Yemen
- Interactive map of Al-Abbas Mosque
- Coordinates: 15°12′29″N 44°25′52″E

Architecture
- Type: Mosque
- Established: 1125 CE (519 AH)
- Minaret: 1

Al-Abbas Mosque is a historic mosque located in the village of Asnaf, in the Khawlan region, southeast of Sana'a, Yemen. Built in 1125 CE (519 AH) during the Sulayhid dynasty, it was commissioned by Sultan Musa bin Muhammad al-Fati. The mosque sits on a site that has been considered sacred since pre-Islamic times.

== History ==
The mosque was established in 1125 CE, as confirmed by inscriptions within the structure. It is named after Al-Abbas, a revered Islamic figure believed to be buried at the site.

By the 1980s, the mosque's ceiling had deteriorated due to age and environmental conditions. In 1985, the Yemeni government requested assistance from the French Center for Yemeni Studies. The ceiling was carefully dismantled and transported to the National Museum of Yemen in Sana'a for preservation.

Restoration began in 1987, led by a team of Yemeni and French experts, including conservator Marylene Barret and architect Abdullah al-Hadhrami. The restoration was completed in 1996, focusing on preserving the authenticity and architectural heritage of the structure.

== Architecture ==
The mosque reflects a traditional Yemeni cubic architectural style. Its structure incorporates large limestone blocks with Sabaean inscriptions, indicating the reuse of materials from an earlier religious or pre-Islamic site.

The building features six columns — four ancient stone columns and two made of mudbrick. Three of the stone columns still retain their original carved capitals. The lower portion of the walls is made of stone, while the upper sections are constructed using mudbrick, a common traditional technique in Yemen.

The ceiling comprises 22 coffered wooden panels, richly decorated with floral and geometric designs, along with painted and gilded Arabic calligraphy. This ceiling was one of the main focuses of the restoration work.

== Restoration and Recognition ==
The restoration of the Al-Abbas Mosque was recognized with the Aga Khan Award for Architecture in 2004.

== See also ==
- List of mosques in Yemen
- Islamic architecture
- Sulayhid dynasty
- Aga Khan Award for Architecture
