= Marib General Hospital =

- Marib General Hospital Authority

Geography
- Location: Ma'rib, Yemen
- Coordinates: 15.460262°N 45.303133°E

Organisation
- Type: General

Services
- Beds: 120

Links
- Lists: Hospitals in Yemen

Marib General Hospital is a government hospital in Ma'rib, Yemen.

In 2014 Yemen LNG signed an agreement with the Governor of Ma'rib Governorate to extend the hospital with a cardiac center, training programs for health workers, medical equipment and mobile ambulances.

It came under fire from Houthi forces in April 2016.

The facility contains 120 beds, though in November 2017 many were occupied by injured soldiers, and the number of landmine injuries had driven three rooms to be used as a dedicated prosthetics workshop.

== See also ==
- List of hospitals in Yemen
