= Al Shohada Mosque (Sanaa) =

Mosque in Sana'a, Yemen

- مسجد الشهداء
- Yemen

Religion
- Affiliation: Sunni Islam

Location
- Location: Sana'a, Yemen
- Interactive map of Al Shohada Mosque
- Coordinates: 15°20′55″N 44°12′57″E

Architecture
- Type: Mosque

The Al Shohada Mosque (Arabic: مسجد الشهداء) is a mosque in Sana'a, Yemen. It lies to the south of the ancient Great Mosque of Sana'a and Ghumdan Palace., between the Yemeni military defense complex (to the west) and Ashohada Cemetery (to the east).

== See also ==
- List of mosques in Yemen
  - List of mosques in Sanaa
