= Abdulhadi as-Soudi Mosque =

Destroyed mosque in Taiz, Yemen

- Arabic: مسجد عبد الهادي السودي
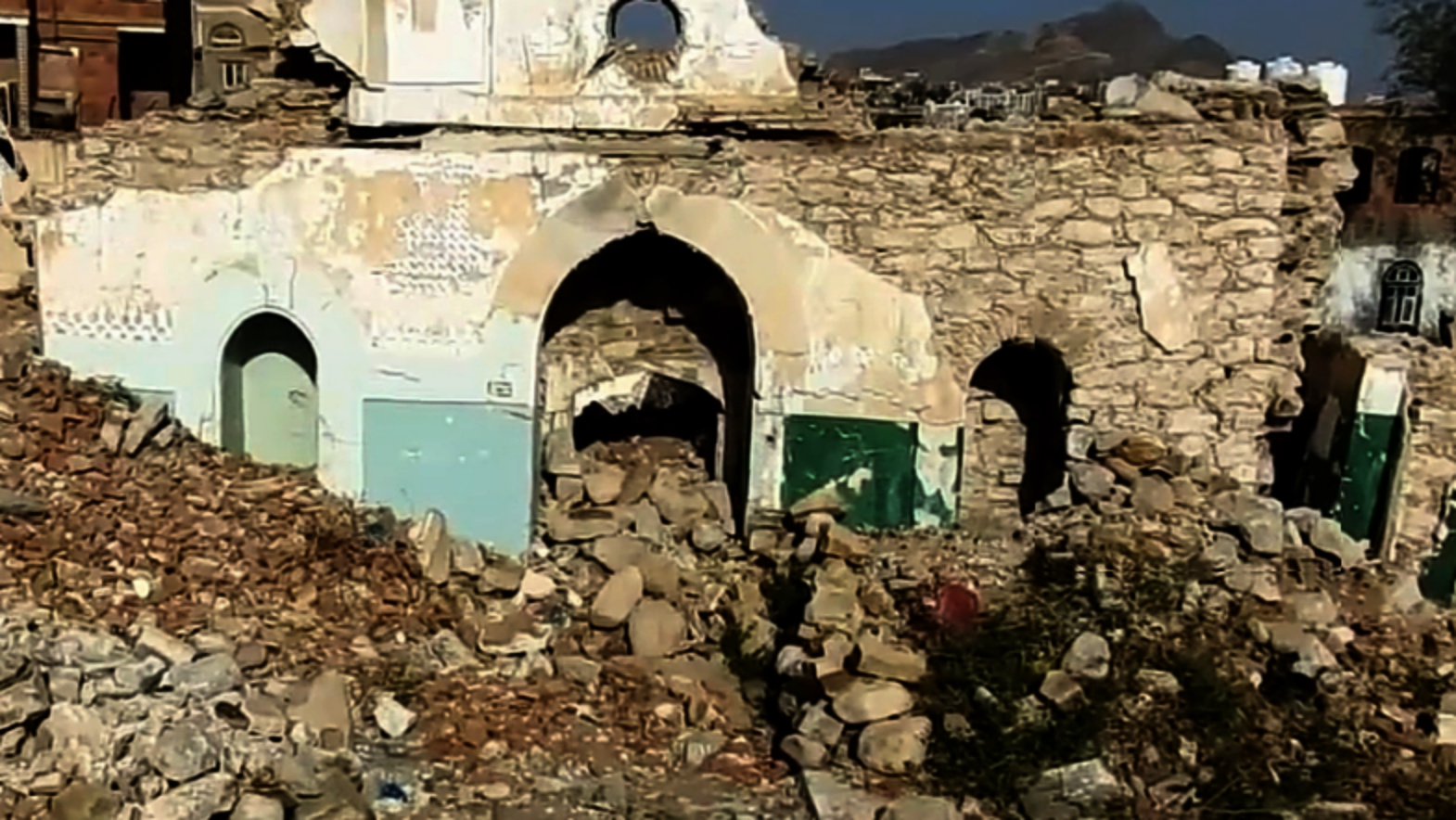
- The ruined mosque in 2017, with a wall of the central chamber still standing

- Location in Yemen

Religion
- Affiliation: Islam
- Region: South Arabia

Location
- Location: Taiz, Yemen
- Country: Yemen
- Interactive map of Abdulhadi as-Soudi Mosque
- Coordinates: 13.5696218°N 44.0079645°E

Architecture
- Style: Islamic architecture
- Established: 16th century

The Abdulhadi as-Soudi Mosque (Arabic: مسجد عبد الهادي السودي) is a now-destroyed historic mosque located in the city of Taiz in southwestern Yemen. It is named for Abdul Hadi as-Soudi, a Muslim scholar and poet who is buried there along with some of his family. The mosque was destroyed in 2016 by Islamist militants who were reportedly from al-Qaeda.

== History ==
The mosque was first constructed during the later years of the rule of the Tahirid Sultanate, and then renovated during the rule of the Ottoman Empire over Yemen. It not only functioned as a place for prayer, but also as a place for Sufi gatherings. The renowned poet and Muslim scholar Abdul Hadi as-Soudi was buried in a room within the mosque known as the Qubbat Abdulhadi as-Soudi.

== Architecture ==
The mosque building was only a single story, with a courtyard and a place for the Sufis to conduct their meetings. A large white dome topped the structure; this dome was regarded as one of the largest mosque domes in Yemen before the destruction in 2016. A dome topped the room known as the Qubbat Abdulhadi as-Soudi which contained the mausoleum where the remains of the mosque's namesake and some other Sufi saints were entombed. A cemetery also exists behind the mosque, and it is still active since 2016.

== Desecration ==
=== 2015 vandalism ===
In September 2015, the Abdulhadi as-Soudi Mosque was vandalized and looted by Islamist militants. It was reported that they stole furniture, pottery, and some decorative elements from the mosque. Reportedly, the remains of the Sufi saints, including that of Abdulhadi as-Soudi, were exhumed from their graves.

=== 2016 destruction ===
The Abdulhadi as-Soudi Mosque was ultimately destroyed in 2016, when Islamist militants planted explosives within the mosque and detonated them, destroying the mosque and mausoleum completely. According to some news outlets, the militants were from al-Qaeda while another claim was that they were backed by ISIL. Al Arabiya reported that a Salafi leader named Abu'l Abbas led the militants into the mosque at night, where they were able to discreetly place the explosives within the structure. As of 2020, the site is still in ruins and has not been rebuilt yet. Google Maps satellite imagery confirms this as well.

== See also ==
- Destruction of cultural heritage by the Islamic State
- List of mosques in Yemen
- Islam in Yemen
