= Lahej =

Lahej لحج
- City
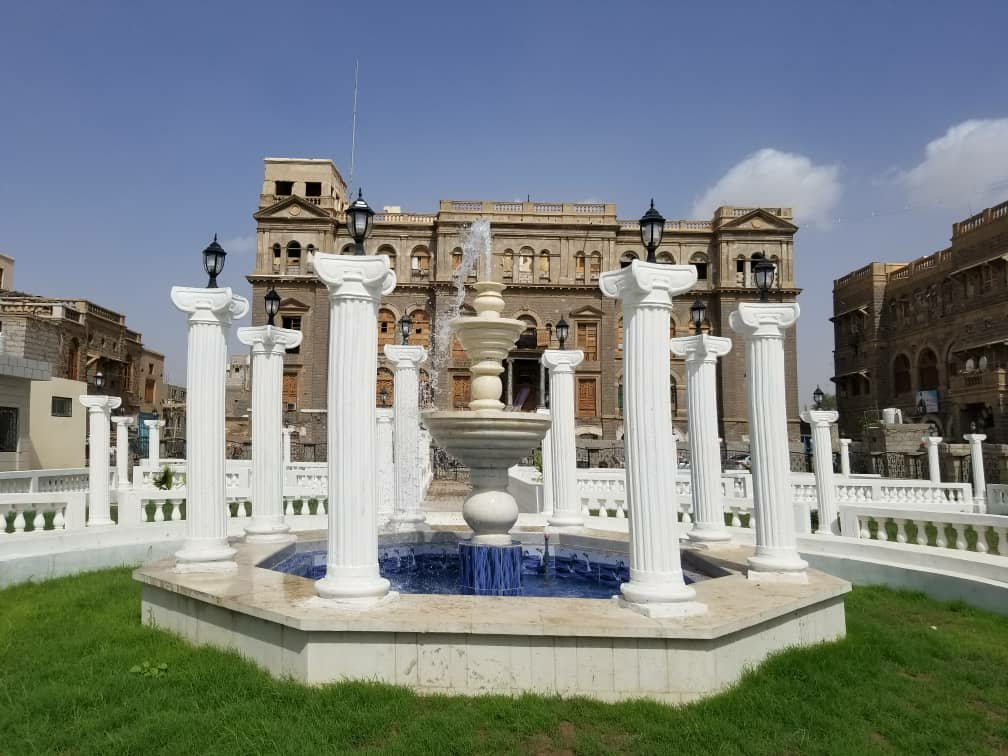
- The City of Lahij, Capital of Lahj Governorate . Sultan Abdali Palace and Andalus Park in the background

- Location in Yemen
- Coordinates: 13°03′N 44°53′E
- Country: Yemen
- Governorate: Lahij
- Elevation: 125 m (410 ft)

Population (2012)
  - Total: 30,661
- Time zone: UTC+3 (Yemen Standard Time)

Lahej or Lahij (Arabic: لحج, romanized: Laḥj), formerly called Al-Hawtah, is a city and an area located between Ta'izz and Aden in Yemen. It is the capital of the Lahij Governorate.

From the 18th to the 20th century, its rulers were of the Abdali branch of the Al-Sallami tribe who trace their lineage to one of the 10 tribes of Yaffa called Kalad. Lahij was the capital city of the Sultanate of Lahej, a protectorate of the British Empire until 1967, when the sultan was expelled and the city became a part of People's Republic of South Yemen. When Yemen Arab Republic and South Yemen merged on 22 May 1990, Lahij became part of the Republic of Yemen.

Lahej is in the delta of the Wadi Tuban on the main trade route connecting Aden with Ta'izz, Ibb, and Sanaa. Al-Hawtah is known for the shrine of al-Salih Muzahim Ja'far, which attracts pilgrims from throughout Yemen during the month of Rajab. It is known as "al-Hawtah al-Ja'fariyyah" in his honor.

== History ==
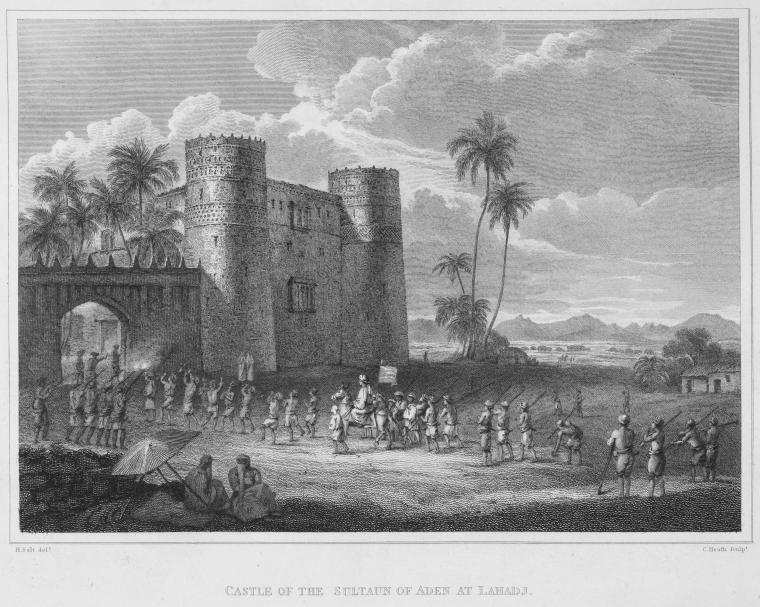
Castle of the Sultan of Aden at Lahej in 1814 before the occupation of Aden by the British in 1839 Abdali Sultanate of Lahej, Yemen.

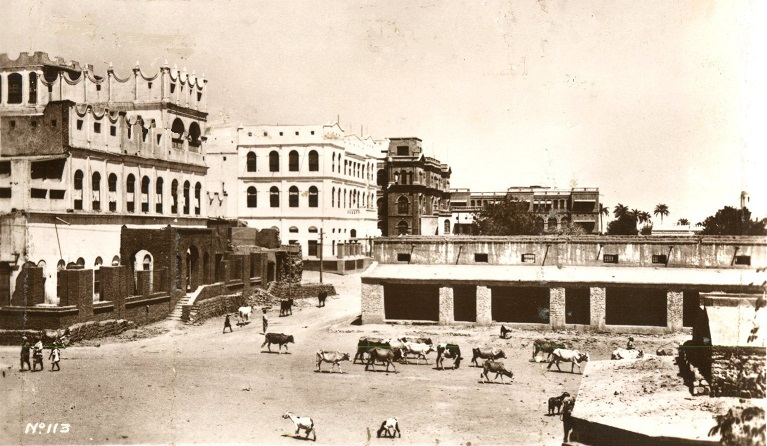
The town of Lahej, capital of the sultanate of the same name. The sultan's palace in the background. Postcard issued c. 1935.

The capital of Lahj used to be at al-Ra'ra', which was destroyed when the Ottomans conquered the Tahirids in the early 1500s and then all but disappears from historical records. Al-Hawtah became capital then.

Lahej has always historically been identified as Aden's base city. Since Aden was a port city, not many Yemenis lived there, rather it was used by many foreigners for its location. Lahej has always been one of the very fertile parts of Yemen and was nicknamed "Lahej Al Khathra", which translates to Lahej the green. This means it stood out from the rest of Yemen which was known to be desert. In the early 1700s a few Sallami tribesmen (members of the Al-Sallami family who migrated from Kalad region of Lower Yaffa) migrated to the Tuban Delta in Lahej and settled between the 2 valleys that surround Lahej. Their new settlement was named Al-Majhafa which translates to "the unfair" in Arabic due to settlers upset with the lack of provisions the area offered them. Many of these settlers were Bedouin permanent migrants from Abyan, Baidha and Shabwa regions. Some were also Yaffai tribesmen like the Sallami family. Others were various Hoshabis from the Musaymeer area looking for new lands. During this time, Hadrami religious Sayids made their way into the area and as custom, one of them name Balfijar asked to established a howtah (الحوطة). A howtah in Hadrami culture is where a few religious imams ask surrounding tribes to allow them to create a settlement that is guarded by a boundary of trees in which no tribesmen can enter with their weapons. The howtah is a sacred place of religious learning where people can live without tribal violence. There are many howtahs that stretch Yemen from Hadramout to Lahej, however the howtah in Lahej outgrew its original plan and became a settlement. Today the capital of the Lahej Governorate is called Al-Howtah. It is the same howtah that was created by Imam Balfijar.

The Lahj region experienced instability after Yemeni government forces withdrew from the area in 2012, and Tribal Popular Committee funding was cut. The reduced state presence emboldened al-Qaeda in the Arabian Peninsula to launch a series of attacks in the governorate in June 2013. On 28 January 2015, al-Qaeda demolished the historic Sufyan Mosque in the Al Hota village district. Then on 20 March, al-Qaeda fighters captured al-Hawtah and killed about 20 people during their brief occupation of the city before being driven out by government forces. Less than a week later, on 26 March, Houthi forces captured al-Hawtah and the nearby Al Anad Air Base en route to Aden. They held the city until August, when Southern Transitional Council-led airstrikes bombarded Houthi positions and cleared the way for hundreds of government troops to move north toward Al Anad Air Base. The Houthis were driven out by 4 August, losing most of their heavy weaponry in the process.

Al-Qaeda struck again in early 2016, capturing the city on 25 January and holding it until government forces retook it on 15 April after a major battle. In June, the Security Belt Forces were inaugurated in Lahj to serve as the main military and police force in the area. Al-Qaeda led an attack on the Security Belt headquarters in March 2017 but failed to take control of the city.

On 16 November 2017, the Southern Transitional Council announced at a festival in al-Hawtah that they would be assuming control of Lahj and ad-Dali' governorates. With al-Qaeda being driven out of the governorate altogether in 2018, the new conflict was mostly between the STC and the Yemeni national government. Armed clashes broke out between the two sides' forces on 28 August 2019, resulting in the central government's forces taking control of the Security Belt headquarters and the city as a whole. Two days later, on 30 August, the Security Belt forces were able to retake control of the city for the STC from the central government.

In 2020 there were reports of armed men intimidating merchants in al-Hawtah.

== Economy ==
Historically, Lahej has produced coconuts. As of 1920, it used caravans to trade with Aden.

Al-Hawtah is the site of Lahj Governorate's main jasmine market, where it is gathered from farmers and then sold to cities throughout Yemen. Lahji jasmine is often considered the best jasmine in Yemen due to its strong, long-lasting fragrance, and jasmine forms a major part of Lahji culture and regional identity.

== Health ==
There are 39 healthcare facilities in al-Hawtah, including 4 government-owned and 35 privately owned. The government-owned facilities include 1 each of a public hospital, a maternity and childhood health center, a blood bank, and a health office. The privately owned facilities include 16 clinics and 19 pharmacies. A survey as of March 2020 indicated that all 39 facilities were fully functioning (compared to 75% for the governorate as a whole).

A significant impediment for the healthcare sector in al-Hawtah is lack of funds, partly caused by the weak exchange rate of the Yemeni rial to the US dollar. There is also a shortage of medical staff because of retirements and low salaries. Increases in the general population have also outpaced supply of medicines and other medical supplies, causing a shortage in that area as well. The Yemeni civil war has also caused significant damage to health infrastructure, particularly due to frequent power outages, and an influx of internally displaced people has also exacerbated ongoing medical shortages. Many of these IDPs lack have not been vaccinated against common diseases, leading to outbreaks in the city. Lack of food security also increased rates of malnutrition.

The Ibn Khaldun Hospital, the main public hospital in Lahj Governorate, was built in al-Hawtah in 1990. It has a bed capacity of 250. Most internally displaced people at other healthcare facilities get transferred to Ibn Khaldun for treatment. Services are generally provided free of charge so the hospital does not generate revenue. The Ibn Khaldun Hospital lacks air conditioning and medical specialists, most of whom have fled the country.

In 2015, al-Hawtah's maternity and child health center suffered major damage, which severely impeded access to healthcare for women and children. The maternity ward and storage unit were renovated in 2019 under direction of the United Nations Development Programme and SFD with a funding of US$136,548. As of 2020, it was reported as the largest and most-used medical storage facility in the governorate.

== Education ==
As of 2017–18 school year, al-Hawtah had 1 preschool, 11 primary schools, 2 secondary schools, and 0 combined primary/secondary schools. Many of the city's schools are in poor condition due to ongoing conflict and lack of funds for maintenance; some have even been reported as being near collapse. They also have poor access to electricity and drinking water. There is a shortage of qualified teachers, who are often paid insufficiently and inconsistently. In January 2020, al-Hawtah's teachers went on strike in an attempt to get increased wages and monetary reimbursement for time spent working without pay. Since the outbreak of the civil war, there has been an increase in student enrollment because many internally displaced children came to al-Hawtah, putting further stress on the city's educators. Many children also feel physically unsafe going to school. Female participation in the education system remains relatively low compared to males, both among students and teachers.

The Nasser College of Agricultural Sciences was established in al-Hawtah in 1969 as a joint Yemeni-Egyptian project and quickly became the country's main agricultural institute. Its curriculum was initially prepared by members of Zagazig University's Faculty of Agricultural Sciences and adapted from Egyptian curriculums to meet local conditions. The Nasser College later became one of the three founding members of the University of Aden. It started offering graduate programs in 1996. By the eve of the Yemeni civil war, the college offered 7 master's programs and 2 doctoral programs. In 2015, when the war reached Lahj Governorate, the Nasser College was extensively looted and destroyed. All its holdings - including livestock, rare bird species, lab equipment, and tools - were stolen and it was left without hands-on teaching materials, leaving it only able to offer theoretical instruction. By 2020, private homes had been built on what had previously been college grounds.

== Transport ==
A railway connecting Lahej with Aden was opened on 11 February 1919 and was extended to Al Khudad opening on 7 January 1920. There were two trains per day in each direction carrying passengers and goods. The railway was closed in July 1929.

== Climate ==
Lahej has a hot desert climate (BWh) according to the Köppen climate classification.

Climate data for Lahij
Month	Jan	Feb	Mar	Apr	May	Jun	Jul	Aug	Sep	Oct	Nov	Dec	Year
Mean daily maximum °C (°F)	31.6 (88.9)	32.4 (90.3)	34.4 (93.9)	37.2 (99.0)	38.7 (101.7)	39.5 (103.1)	39.4 (102.9)	38.3 (100.9)	37.1 (98.8)	35.7 (96.3)	33.6 (92.5)	32.3 (90.1)	35.9 (96.5)
Daily mean °C (°F)	25.7 (78.3)	26.4 (79.5)	28.3 (82.9)	30.8 (87.4)	32.7 (90.9)	33.5 (92.3)	33.6 (92.5)	32.7 (90.9)	31.6 (88.9)	30.0 (86.0)	27.7 (81.9)	26.3 (79.3)	29.9 (85.9)
Mean daily minimum °C (°F)	19.9 (67.8)	20.4 (68.7)	22.2 (72.0)	24.4 (75.9)	26.7 (80.1)	27.6 (81.7)	27.9 (82.2)	27.2 (81.0)	26.1 (79.0)	24.4 (75.9)	21.8 (71.2)	20.3 (68.5)	24.1 (75.3)
Average precipitation mm (inches)	4 (0.2)	1 (0.0)	3 (0.1)	12 (0.5)	18 (0.7)	2 (0.1)	19 (0.7)	46 (1.8)	67 (2.6)	20 (0.8)	2 (0.1)	2 (0.1)	196 (7.7)
Source: Climate-Data.org
