= Al Sabeen Maternal Hospital =

Geography
- Location: Sana'a, Yemen
- Coordinates: 15°19′48″N 44°12′25″E

Organisation
- Type: Specialist

Services
- Speciality: Maternity

Links
- Lists: Hospitals in Yemen

Al Sabeen Maternal Hospital, also El Sabeen Maternity and Child Hospital, is a hospital in Sana'a, Yemen. It is located in the south of the city, immediately north of the Saleh Mosque.

== See also ==
- List of hospitals in Yemen
