= Al-Bakiriyya Mosque =

Mosque in Sana'a, Yemen

- جامع البكيرية
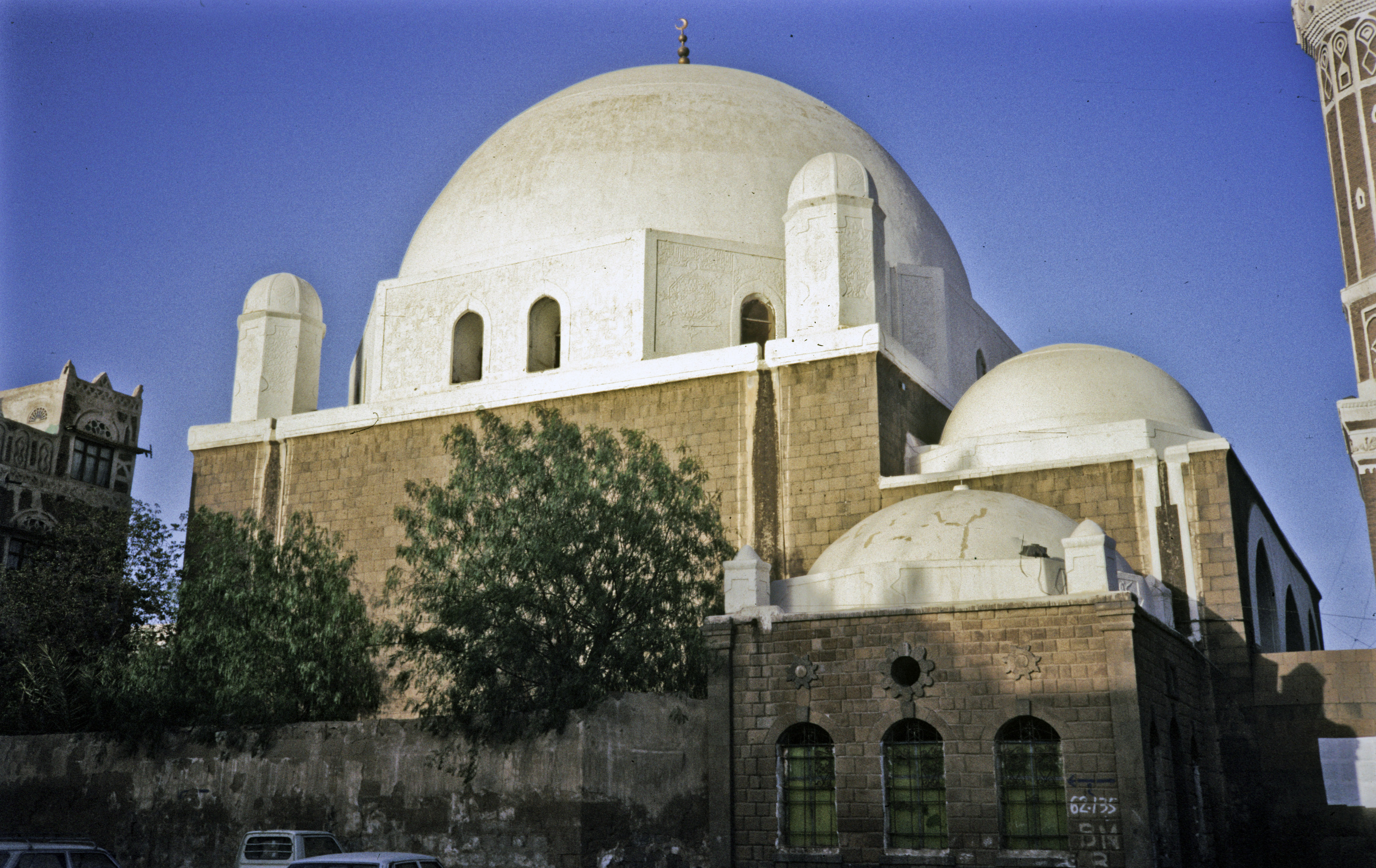

- Yemen

Religion
- Affiliation: Islam
- Branch/tradition: Sunni

Location
- Location: Sana'a, Yemen
- Coordinates: 15°21′11″N 44°12′54″E

Architecture
- Type: Mosque
- Style: Ottoman
- Completed: 1597

Al-Bakiriyya in 1926.

Bakiriyya Mosque is a mosque constructed in Sana'a around 1596–97 by the Ottoman governor of Yemen, Hasan Pasha. The mosque fell into disrepair after the Ottomans were driven out of Yemen in 1626 but was fully restored when the Ottomans recaptured Sana'a in 1878.

== Description ==
The mosque has one minaret and a large prayer hall covered by an Ottoman style dome. The Dome of Al-Bakiriyya mosque consists of two main parts, one of which is exposed and called the Sanctuary, Pylon or courtyard, and the other is covered and known as the House of Prayer or Prayer hall. Several smaller domed extensions surround the main prayer hall.

=== Interior ===
The minbar and mihrab were made of material imported from Istanbul.

== See also ==
- Islam in Yemen
- List of mosques in Yemen
