= Qafa e Vishës bus accident =

2012 motor vehicle incident in Albania

Coordinates: 40.1167°N 19.7333°E

Details
- Date: 21 May 2012
- Location: Qafa e Vishës near Himarë, Albania

Statistics
- Deaths: 13
- Injured: 21

The Qafa e Vishës bus accident occurred on 21 May 2012, at Qafa e Vishës (Albanian pronunciation: [cafa ɛ viʃəs]) near Himarë, Albania, when a bus plunged 80 metres (260 ft) off a cliff. Most of the victims were students of Aleksandër Xhuvani University of Elbasan. The driver is also believed to have been killed. The students were travelling from Elbasan to Sarandë.

== Incident ==
The bus fell into an 80-metre (262 ft) ravine off the road, according to police spokeswoman Klejda Plangarica, and a police investigation was under way. Ambulances and rescue helicopters were sent to assist the wounded and bring them to hospital, amid fears the casualty count could rise.

The Mayor of Himarë, Jorgo Goro, declared that all available resources in and extensive citizen participation the area did everything in their power to save the injured. In an interview with Top Channel, he emphasized that the investigation team took all necessary steps to determine what caused the accident and declared that part of the road had already been repaired, though the bodies of the 11 victims were still there. An eyewitness told Top Channel that the local residents had rushed to help the passengers that were still alive.

== Reactions ==
Albanian President Bamir Topi, who visited the Tirana Military Hospital, where some of the injured were taken, expressed his "sincere condolences" to the relatives of the victims and his regret for the accident. "The entire Albanian state has risen to help the injured." Albanian Prime Minister Sali Berisha sent condolences to the families of those killed from Chicago, where he was attending the 2012 NATO Chicago Summit. Socialist Party leader Edi Rama visited the hospital and donated blood for the injured, as well as expressing his deep regret for the lost lives and declaring that all Socialist controlled municipalities in southern Albania, Vlora, Orikum and Himarë were moving to help ease the situation. "A horrible tragedy has shocked our nation today. These are hours of solidarity and efforts for trying and save any human life possible. I am sure that the Military Hospital will make everything possible for saving the lives of the injured victims."

The Government of Albania, with an order by Berisha, declared 22 May to be a day of national mourning with flags flown at half-mast and public television Radio Televizioni Shqiptar broadcast classical music. As result of the crash, Albanian public broadcaster RTSH did not broadcast the first semifinal of the 2012 Eurovision Song Contest live and instead delayed the broadcast by more than 2 hours. As a result of the deferral of the contest, the country utilized jury votes for the first semifinal and utilized them again in the final on 26 May. Albanian entrant Rona Nishliu stated during a press conference that she dedicated her performance to all of those who were killed and injured. RTK also preempted its normal primetime television lineup to cover the bus crash. The government would also pay all funeral expenses.

Kosovo's Foreign Minister, Enver Hoxhaj, expressed the deep shock of the Kosovo citizens. "We join the deep regret and sorrow of the families that lost their children in this tragedy. The Kosovo people are praying for a quick recovery of the injured." Hoxhaj also expressed the full solidarity and readiness of the Kosovo government to help the Albanian authorities and family in every possible way. President of Kosovo Atifete Jahjaga, Chairman of the Assembly Jakup Krasniqi and Prime Minister Hashim Thaçi also expressed their condolences on behalf of the people and the state of Kosovo. On 24 May Ambassador Arvizu during a visit to the University of Elbasan "Aleksandër Xhuvani," accompanied by the Mayor of Elbasan Qazim Sejdini, and lecturers, Ambassador Arvizu laid a bouquet of flowers in front of the photos of victims. The embassy of Turkey and the Ambassador of the European Union also expressed condolences.

Pope Benedict XVI sent a condolence message to the Apostolic Administration of Southern Albania, Monsignor Hil Kabashi for Himara tragedy. The Pope charged to convey to victims' families deep feelings of grief, and provides for his prayer from the heart for the dead and wounded.
