= University Hospital "Shefqet Ndroqi" =

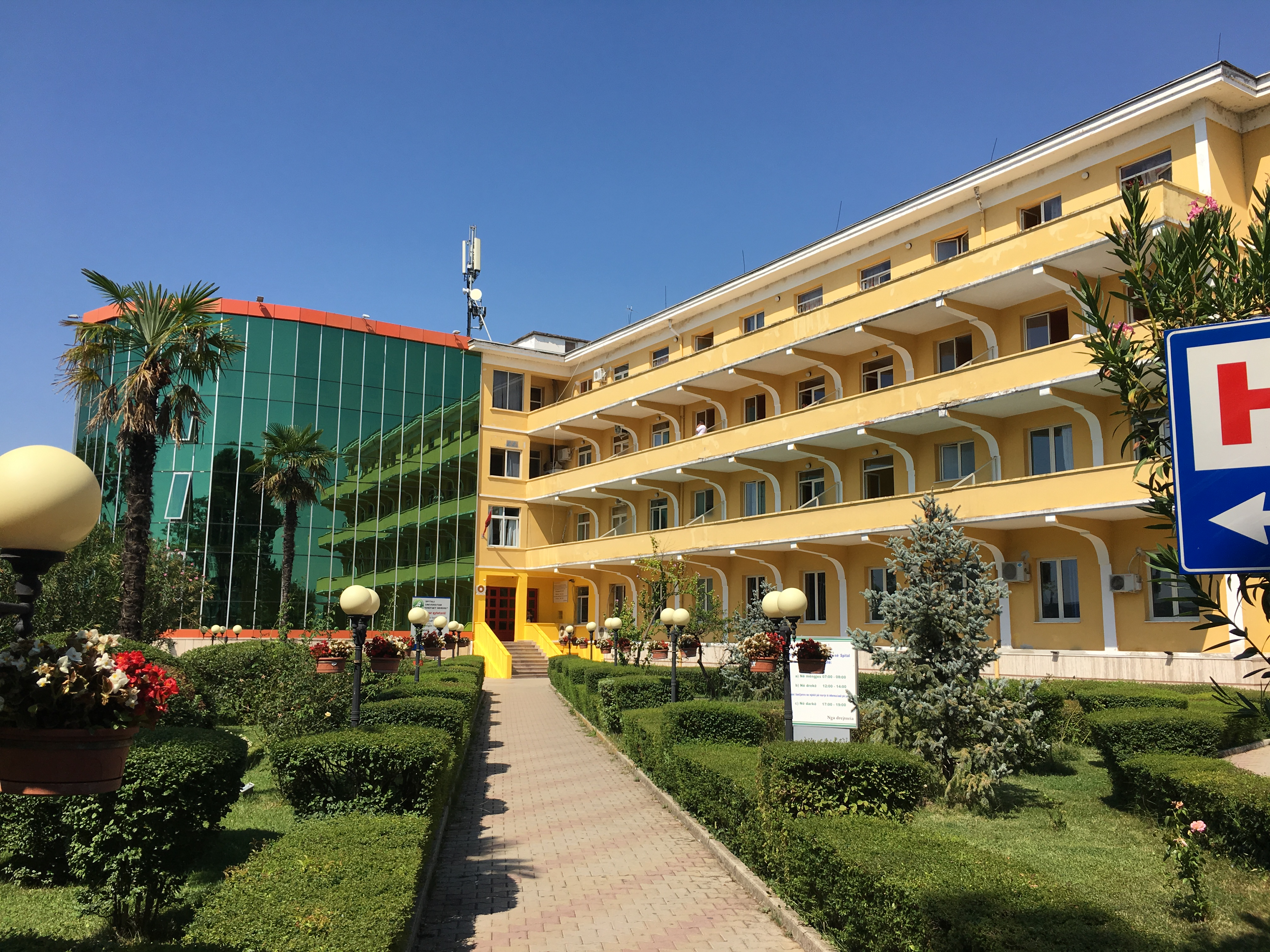

Geography
- Location: Rruga Shefqet Ndroqi, Dr. Shefqet Ndroqi, Tirana, Albania
- Coordinates: 41.313599°N 19.8440816°E

Organisation
- Type: Specialist

Services
- Emergency department: Yes
- Speciality: Tuberculosis

Helipads
- Helipad: No

History
- Founded: 1945

Links
- Website: www.sushefqetndroqi.gov.al

The University Hospital "Shefqet Ndroqi" is a tuberculosis sanatorium established in Fuat Bey Hill, Tirana in 1945. The hospital has more than 100 beds and various room types and facilities.

== See also ==
- Ministry of Health
