= List of mosques in Yemen =

This is a list of mosques in the Republic of Yemen, in the southern part of the Arabian Peninsula.

Name	Images	Location	Year/century	Remarks
Aidrus Mosque		City of Aden	1699	Named for Abu Bakr al-Aydarus, a Sufi mystic.
Al-Abbas Mosque		Sana'a, Yemen.	1125 CE	One of the early mosques of Islam.
Al-Asha'ir Mosque		Zabid, Al-Hudaydah	628	One of the early mosques of Islam. Part of UNESCO's World Heritage Site of Zabid.
Al-Muhdhar Mosque		Tarim, Hadhramaut	1914	With a height of approximately 53 m (174 ft), the minaret is the tallest mudbrick structure in the World.
Qubbat az-Zum Mosque		Jiblah, Ibb	1515–1516	One of two prominent mosques in the historical town of Jibla.
Queen Arwa Mosque		Jiblah	1111	Associated with Queen Arwa al-Sulayhi, and is one of the two iconic mosques of Jibla, Yemen.
Al-Hadi Mosque		City of Sa'dah	897	
Sufyan Mosque		Lahij	1215	Dedicated to Sufyan ibn Abdullah al-Abini al-Yamani, a Muslim scholar who fought in the 1187 Battle of Hattin against the Crusaders in Jerusalem.
Alansar Mosque		Sanaa	?	
Al-Bakiriyya Mosque		Sanaa	1596–1597	Part of UNESCO World Heritage Site Old City of Sana'a.
Abdulhadi as-Soudi Mosque		Taiz	16th century	Named for Abdul Hadi as-Soudi, a prominent poet and Muslim scholar involved in Sufism. Destroyed by Islamists in 2016, and currently still in ruins as of 2020.
Alemaan Mosque		Sanaa	?	
Al-Mahdi Mosque		Sanaa	1651	Part of UNESCO World Heritage Site Old City of Sana'a.
Al-Saleh Mosque		Sanaa	2008	The largest mosque in the country.
Al-Shohada' Mosque		Sanaa	?	
Al-Towheed Mosque		Sanaa	?	
Great Mosque of Sana'a		Sanaa	7th-8th Century	Part of UNESCO World Heritage Site Old City of Sana'a.
Hanthel Mosque		Sanaa	?	
Ashrafiya Mosque		City of Ta'iz	1275	
Al-Janad Mosque		Taiz	7th-century	
Mudhaffar Mosque		Taiz	13th Century	
Talha Mosque		Sanaa	1620	

== See also ==
- List of mosques in Sana'a
- Islam in Yemen
- Lists of mosques
