= Tirana Military Hospital =

University hospital for traumatic injuries Tirana, Albania

University hospital for traumatic injuries Spitali Universitar i Traumes

Geography
- Location: Rruga Lord Bajron, 1001 Tirana, Albania
- Coordinates: 41.343443°N 19.795761°E

Organisation
- Type: Specialist

Services
- Emergency department: Yes
- Speciality: Trauma center

Helipads
- Helipad: Yes

History
- Founded: 1929

Links
- Website: https://sut.gov.al/

The University hospital for traumatic injuries (SUT; Shqip: Spitali Universitar i Traumës) was the former Tirana military hospital located in Tirana, Albania. It was founded on September 26, 1929.

It is now part of the university hospital specialised for traumatic injuries. It still takes care for military staff but is open for public and is part of the state-wide health care system.

During the Kosovo War, it was used extensively in the treatment of wounded soldiers.

== See also ==
- Mother Teresa Hospital (Tirana)
- 2008 Gërdec explosions
- Qafa e Vishës bus tragedy
