= German Hospital in Tirana =

Hospital in Tirana, Albania

Geography
- Location: Rruga Nikolla Lena, Tirana, Albania, Albania
- Coordinates: 41°19′34″N 19°48′22″E

Organisation
- Type: Specialist

Services
- Speciality: Cardiology

Links
- Lists: Hospitals in Albania

The German Hospital Tirana is a hospital in Tirana, Albania.

== Description ==
The German Hospital Tiran cooperates with the largest Cardiac Clinics in the world. The Center of Cardiovascular Care is the largest hospital in the Balkan countries.

=== Departments ===
- Anaesthesia,
- Cardiac Surgery,
- Cardiology,
- Intensive Care Medicine,
- Radiology,
- Laboratory,
- Out-Patient Department,

== Services ==
The cardiac surgery program at The German Hospital in Tirana is offering a full range of services and surgical interventions.

=== Cardiac Surgery ===
==== Apart from routine they are also specialized in ====
- Physiological repair of mitral heart valves,
- Advanced coronary artery bypass surgery,
- Advanced aortic valve surgery,
- Thoracic aneurysm interventions,

=== Cardiology ===
==== The cardiology team offers ====
- Modern state-of-the-art invasive and non-invasive cardiological diagnostic procedures,
- Executive Health Programs for individual Health Check-up,
- Risc factor management - Diabetes and Hypertension screening,
- Screening, diagnosis and treatment of coronary artery disease, valve disease and heart rhythm disorders,

== Career ==
Currently the German Hospital is searching for doctors. Open positions are:

- Cardiologist (Chief & Consultant - interventional & non-interventional cardiology),
- Anesthesist (Consultant - cardiovascular anesthsist),
- ICU nurses (Cardiovascular Intensive Care),
