= Revolution Hospital =

- Yemeni Government

Geography
- Location: Sana'a, Yemen
- Coordinates: 15°21′3″N 44°13′15″E

Organisation
- Type: General

Links
- Lists: Hospitals in Yemen

Revolution Hospital is the largest hospital in Yemen, located in the capital of Sana'a, immediately southwest of Ghumdan Palace. It is one of the largest building complexes in the city.

This hospital may also be known as Al Thawra Revolution Hospital.

== See also ==
- Health in Yemen
  - List of hospitals in Yemen
