= Al-Janad Mosque =

Mosque in Yemen

Coordinates: 13°40′7.2″N 44°9′59.2″E

Al-Janad Mosque جامع الجند
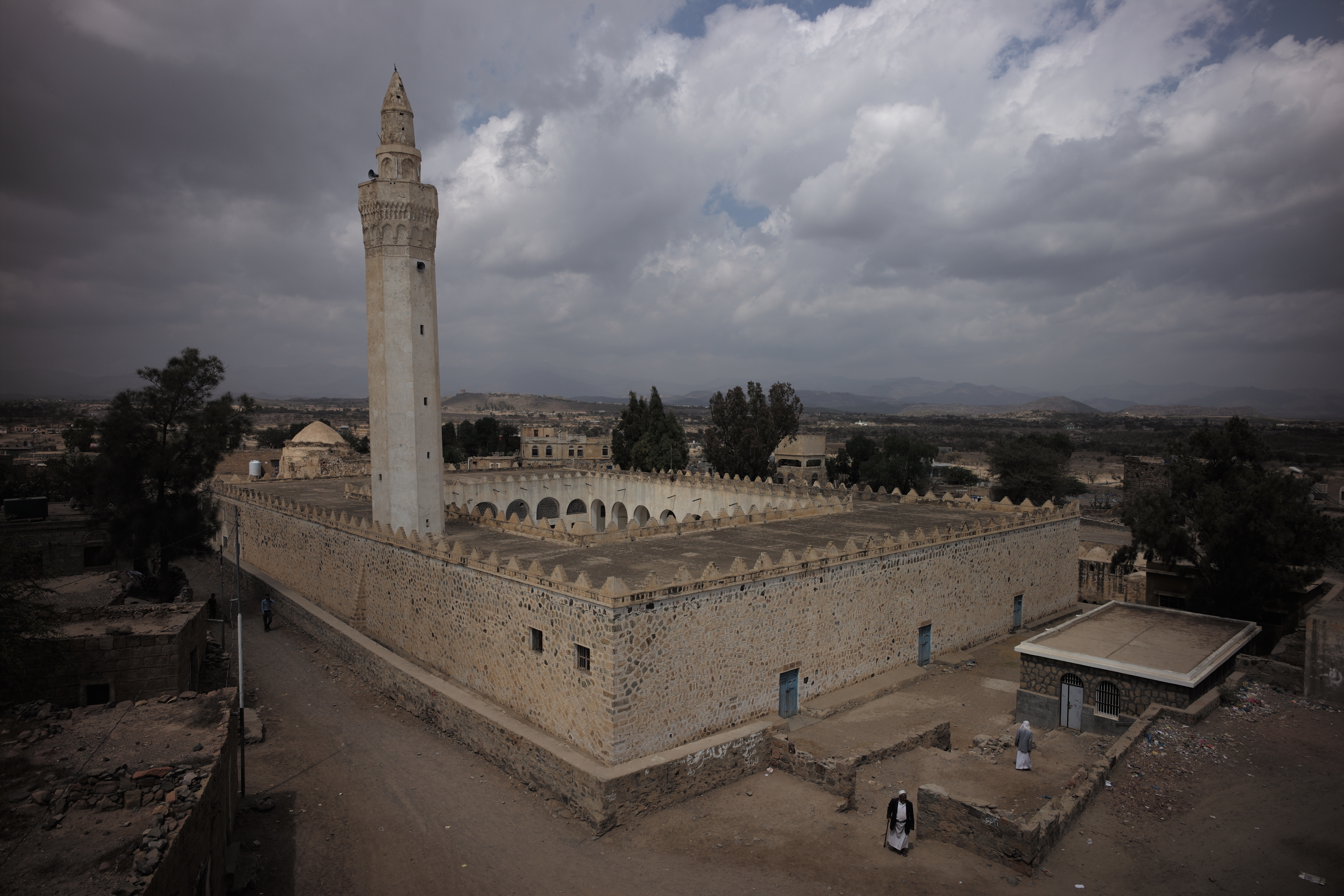

Religion
- Affiliation: Islam
- Region: West Asia
- Status: Active

Location
- Location: Taiz, Yemen
- Interactive map of Al-Janad Mosque جامع الجند

Architecture
- Type: Mosque
- Style: Islamic
- Completed: 7th-century

Al-Janad Mosque (Arabic: جامع الجند) is an ancient mosque established by Muadh ibn Jabal at al-Janad, located 20 kilometres (12 mi) northeast of Taiz, Yemen. It is the oldest surviving mosque in Yemen and considered the first one built. In the earliest days of Islam, in the year 6 AH (628 CE), the Islamic prophet Muhammad sent Muadh ibn Jabal to Yemen to teach its people the provisions regarding the religion and spread it among them, in accordance with Sharia. As such it is one of the most important religious sites in Taiz governorate. It is also known as Mu'adh Mosque.

== History ==
Muadh ibn Jabal built the mosque after meeting with soldiers of the province on the first Friday of Rajab (seventh month of the Islamic calendar). Since then people have been holding festival every day on the first Friday of Rajab, by heading to the mosque to pray and conduct other religious rituals. The mosque has been renovated and restored countless times throughout the history. Al-Husayn ibn Salama re-built the mosque during the period of 896 to 981. It is said that the local governor of Sulayhid dynasty also carried out construction work in the mosque. It was destroyed during the days of Mehdi bin Ali bin Mahdi al-Re'ai al-Humeiri in 1137, and then the Ayyubid ruler Saif al-Din Atabek restored the building in 1154, adding to the building the southern corridor, the side hallways and a sahn. Sultan al-Nasir Ayyub built its ceilings with plaster and carved with gold and lapis lazuli in 1206.

== Architecture ==
The current mosque is rectangular shaped, measuring 65.5 by 43 metres (215 ft × 141 ft). It is surrounded by a wall with 144 serrated balconies. Its general layout consists of an open sahn – 35.5 by 25.5 metres (116 ft × 84 ft) – with a square column height of about two metres (6 ft 7 in). The qibla, which consists of four bays and adorns the qibla wall, has two mihrabs placed between them. It is considered an artistic masterpiece rich in ornamentation, carvings and engravings. It is one of the remaining platforms, dating back to the time of Taghtikin ibn Ayyub in the last quarter of the 12th century. The minaret occupies a part of the southwestern corner and consists of a cylindrical lower part topped by an octagonal shape above which a hexagon revolves and crowns the minaret from the top of the dome. Alongside the minaret there is a stone tablet written by the name of Sultan Amer ibn Abdul Wahab, in addition to other plates that recorded the successive renovations that took place on this mosque through the different historical periods.

The mosque is open to visitors throughout the year.

== See also ==
- List of mosques in Yemen
