= Battle of Yibneh =

1123 Crusader victory over the Fatimids

Coordinates: 31°51′57.5″N 34°44′46.75″E

- Part of the Crusades
| Date | 29 May 1123 |
| Location | Yibna, Kingdom of Jerusalem |
| Result | Crusader victory |

Belligerents
| Kingdom of Jerusalem | Fatimid Caliphate |

Commanders and leaders
| Eustace Grenier | Al-Ma'mun al-Bata'ihi |

Strength
| 7,000 | 16,000 |

Casualties and losses
| Unknown | 6,000 killed |

In the Battle of Yibneh (Yibna) in 1123, a Crusader force led by Eustace Grenier crushed a Fatimid army from Egypt sent by vizier Al-Ma'mun between Ascalon and Jaffa.

== Background ==
After the First Crusade captured Jerusalem from the Fatimids, vizier al-Afdal Shahanshah mounted a series of invasions "almost annually" from 1099 to 1107 against the newly established Kingdom of Jerusalem. Egyptian armies fought three major battles at Ramla in 1101, 1102 and 1105, but they were ultimately unsuccessful. After this, the vizier contented himself to launching frequent raids on Frankish territory from his coastal fortress of Ascalon. In 1121, al-Afdal was assassinated. Meanwhile, Jerusalem was weakened by the capture of King Baldwin II by the Artuqids in northern Syria; the kingdom was at this time governed by the regent Eustace Grenier.

== Battle ==
In 1123, the new vizier, al-Ma'mun al-Bata'ihi, organized a major invasion of Crusader lands. The Fatimids planned to capture the coastal city of Jaffa. In this era, the Egyptian armies usually deployed with Sudanese archers on foot, supported by dense formations of Arab and Berber light cavalry. Unfortunately for the Fatimids, this relatively immobile array provided the Frankish heavy cavalry with an ideal target.

At Yibna, near the later site of the castle of Ibelin (built 1141), the Fatimid invasion force encountered the crusader army of knights and men-at-arms on horseback and spearmen and bowmen on foot. The fighting lasted only a short time as the Egyptian host was unable to withstand the shock of the Crusader cavalry charges. As Fulcher of Chartres says,

this battle did not last long because when our foes saw our armed men (meaning the mounted knights and men-at-arms) advance in excellent order against them their horsemen immediately took flight as if completely bewitched, going into a panic instead of using good sense. Their foot-soldiers were massacred.

The defeat was decisive. Except for continued raids from Ascalon until the Siege of Ascalon in 1153, the Fatimids ceased to be a threat to the Crusader states until the rise of Saladin in 1169. The next major action in the Crusader states would be the Battle of Azaz in 1125.
