= Ali ibn Ibrahim ibn Najib al-Dawla =

Envoy of the Fatimid Caliphate to Yemen from 1119 to 1125

Ali ibn Ibrahim ibn Najib al-Dawla was a scholar who was sent as envoy of the Fatimid Caliphate to Yemen, directly intervening in local affairs of the allied Sulayhid dynasty, from 1119 until his recall in disgrace in 1125.

== Life ==
Ali ibn Ibrahim ibn Najib al-Dawla was the librarian of al-Afdal Shahanshah, the vizier and de facto ruler of the Fatimid Caliphate. His background is unknown, but he was evidently well educated, and it is likely that he was instructed in Isma'ili doctrine as well.

In 1119, al-Afdal resolved to more closely align Yemen, where the Sulayhid queen Arwa (r. 1067–1138) ruled the only major Isma'ili community outside Egypt itself that had remained loyal to Cairo after the Nizari–Musta'li schism in 1095. Ibn Najib al-Dawla was given lofty honorific titles proclaiming his high standing and proximity to the Fatimid imam–caliph, al-Amir (r. 1101–1130), an escort of twenty elite Hujariyya cavalry, and sent to Yemen by sea. The group made first for the island of Dahlak in the Red Sea, where Ibn Najib al-Dawla was instructed by an Isma'ili missionary from Aden about the land and its principal personages, including such details as distinguishing features, scars, or tattoos, which allowed Ibn Najib al-Dawla to later demonstrate his "super-human" insight.

After landing at Aden, Ibn Najib al-Dawla went to Arwa's winter residence at Dhu Jibla. Supported by Arwa and the Banu Hamdan tribe, who provided 300 soldiers, in short time he had become the virtual ruler of the parts of Yemen recognizing Fatimid suzerainty. In 1121, after al-Afdal's assassination, his successor, al-Ma'mun al-Bata'ihi, sent 400 Armenian and 700 Black African archers to Yemen to bolster Ibn Najib al-Dawla's position, again by sea. Disposing of a regular military force loyal only to him, Ibn Najib al-Dawla made al-Janad his base and began to pursue his own policies, disregarding the various tribal chieftains, and even Queen Arwa, whom he is said to have dismissed as a senile old woman.

== Sources ==
- Brett, Michael (2017). The Fatimid Empire. The Edinburgh History of the Islamic Empires. Edinburgh: Edinburgh University Press. ISBN 978-0-7486-4076-8.
- El-Azhari, Taef (2019). Queens, Eunuchs, and Concubines in Islamic History, 661-1257. Edinburgh: Edinburgh University Press. ISBN 978-1-4744-2319-9.
- Haeri, Shahla (2020). The Unforgettable Queens of Islam: Succession, Authority, Gender. Cambridge: Cambridge University Press. ISBN 978-1-107-55489-4.
- Halm, Heinz (2014). Kalifen und Assassinen: Ägypten und der vordere Orient zur Zeit der ersten Kreuzzüge, 1074–1171 [Caliphs and Assassins: Egypt and the Near East at the Time of the First Crusades, 1074–1171] (in German). Munich: C. H. Beck. doi:10.17104/9783406661648-1. ISBN 978-3-406-66163-1. OCLC 870587158.
