= Musa ibn al-Ma'mun al-Bata'ihi =

Son of the Fatimid vizier al-Ma'mun al-Bata'ihi and writer (died 1192)

Musa ibn al-Ma'mun al-Bata'ihi (died 1192) was the son of the Fatimid vizier al-Ma'mun al-Bata'ihi (executed 1128) who wrote a biography of his father. It survives only in fragments quoted by later authors, but is a key source for the history of early 12th-century Egypt, especially for unique details such as court ceremonies. When al-Ma'mun was raised to the vizierate in 1122, Musa and his three brothers received robes of honour from the caliph. Al-Ma'mun also tried to ensure his sons in the case of his own death, having Caliph al-Amir pledge to look after them should he die. Ibn al-Bata' survived his father's downfall and execution, and died in 1192.

The fragments were collected and published by A. F. Sayyid in Passages de la Chronique d’Egypte d’Ibn al-Maʾmūn, Cairo 1983.

== Sources ==
- Halm, Heinz (2014). Kalifen und Assassinen: Ägypten und der vordere Orient zur Zeit der ersten Kreuzzüge, 1074–1171 [Caliphs and Assassins: Egypt and the Near East at the Time of the First Crusades, 1074–1171] (in German). Munich: C. H. Beck. doi:10.17104/9783406661648-1. ISBN 978-3-406-66163-1. OCLC 870587158.
