= Haydara al-Mu'taman =

Abu Turab Haydara al-Mu'taman was a brother of the Fatimid vizier al-Ma'mun al-Bata'ihi (1121–1125). Along with another brother, Ja'far, Haydara served as his brother's chief aide and deputy already during the latter's service as chief of staff to the all-powerful vizier al-Afdal Shahanshah, in 1107–1121. After al-Ma'mun's rise to the vizierate, Haydara was appointed governor of Alexandria. In this capacity he helped defeat an invasion of the Luwata Berbers in 1123, and in the same year fought off the raids of the Venetian fleet that took part in the Venetian Crusade. When al-Ma'mun was abruptly arrested by Caliph al-Amir on 3 October 1125, Haydara was also imprisoned along with several of his brother's associates and relatives. He died in prison before his brother's execution in July 1128.

== Sources ==
- Halm, Heinz (2014). Kalifen und Assassinen: Ägypten und der vordere Orient zur Zeit der ersten Kreuzzüge, 1074–1171 [Caliphs and Assassins: Egypt and the Near East at the Time of the First Crusades, 1074–1171] (in German). Munich: C. H. Beck. doi:10.17104/9783406661648-1. ISBN 978-3-406-66163-1. OCLC 870587158.
