= Al-Ma'mun al-Bata'ihi =

12th-century Fatimid vizier

al-Ma'mun al-Bata'ihi

Vizier of the Fatimid Caliphate
- In office 12 December 1121 (de facto); 13 February 1122 (formal appointment) – 3 October 1125
- Monarch: al-Amir bi-Ahkam Allah
- Preceded by: al-Afdal Shahanshah
- Succeeded by: None (post vacant until 1130)

Personal details
- Died: 19/20 July 1128; Cairo
- Children: Musa and three other sons
- Parent: Fatak (father)

Abu Abdallah Muhammad ibn Fatak, better known as al-Ma'mun al-Bata'ihi (Arabic: المأمون البطائحي), was a senior official of the Fatimid Caliphate in the early 12th century, during the reign of al-Amir.

His origin is obscure, but his father had held high military office, and thus al-Bata'ihi belonged to the Fatimid Egyptian elite. In 1107, at the age of about 21, he was chosen as chief of staff of the vizier al-Afdal Shahanshah, the de facto ruler of the state. In this capacity al-Bata'ihi carried out tax reforms which raised revenue and ensured the payment of the military. Al-Afdal was assassinated in 1121, officially by agents of the rival Nizari branch of Isma'ilism, which opposed the official Fatimid Musta'li Isma'ilism and did not recognize al-Amir as caliph and imam. However, both Caliph al-Amir and al-Bata'ihi are suspected to have been involved in the murder by some sources. Al-Amir appointed al-Bata'ihi to the vacant vizierate, establishing a partnership between caliph and vizier that brought the former once again into the public view, while retaining for the latter the de facto governance of the state.

As vizier, al-Bata'ihi was noted for his ability, justice, and generosity. He celebrated lavish festivals, where al-Amir had the opportunity to play a central role, and commissioned several buildings, of which the most important and only surviving one is the Aqmar Mosque in Cairo. Al-Bata'ihi also hunted down Nizari agents and sympathizers; the al-Hidaya al-Amiriyya, issued in 1122, rebuffed Nizari claims and affirmed the legitimacy of Musta'li Isma'ilism. During his tenure, the Fatimids became more directly involved in Yemen, often ignoring their Sulayhid ally, Queen Arwa. In the Levant, attempts to take the offensive against the Crusaders failed, with a naval defeat at the hands of the Venetian Crusade in 1123 followed by the loss of Tyre in 1124. These failures, coupled with the caliph's resentment at al-Bata'ihi's power, led to his dismissal and imprisonment by al-Amir in 1125. He was then kept imprisoned until July 1128, when al-Amir ordered his execution. His son, Musa, wrote a biography that survives in fragments and is a key source for al-Bata'ihi's career.

== Biography ==
Al-Ma'mun al-Bata'ihi was born in AH 478 (1085/6 CE) or AH 479 (1086/7 CE), but is first mentioned in 1107, when he was appointed to succeed Taj al-Ma'ali Mukhtar as the chief of staff of the vizier al-Afdal Shahanshah. His origin is uncertain. A biography (Sirat al-Ma'mun) written by one of his sons, Musa, survives only in fragments quoted in other works, which do not cover the family's origin, but which ensure that al-Bata'ihi's political career is unusually well documented. Medieval sources affirm that al-Bata'ihi's father, Abu Shuja Fatak, enjoyed high honours from al-Afdal: he received the title of Nur al-Dawla (lit. 'Light of the State') and when he died in 1118, the funeral prayer was read by Caliph al-Amir. Fatak was likely a high-ranking military commander. The nisba (epithet indicating a person's affiliation) of al-Bata'ihi may indicate an ultimate origin of the family in the Batihah marshlands in Iraq, but a rags-to-riches story circulated about al-Bata'ihi being son of a Fatimid agent in Iraq who came to Cairo after being orphaned and worked himself upwards is nothing more than a pious legend. Al-Bata'ihi had two brothers, Haydara and Ja'far, who became his deputies and chief aides, and four sons.

=== Service under al-Afdal ===
At the time, the Fatimid Caliphate was de facto ruled not by the underage caliph al-Amir, but by al-Afdal, with the titles of vizier, commander-in-chief, chief qadi, and chief da'i, a sultan-like position he had inherited from his father, Badr al-Jamali (r. 1074–1094). Furthermore, al-Amir was himself a nephew of al-Afdal via his mother, and was in due course wed to one of al-Afdal's daughters. To assist him in government, al-Afdal initially relied on one of his ghulams (military slaves), Mukhtar Taj al-Ma'ali, and his brothers, but in 1107 their increasingly high-handed and rapacious behaviour brought about their downfall and imprisonment. Al-Bata'ihi succeeded Mukhtar in his post, and received the military title of al-Qa'id ('the Commander').

==== Administrative reforms ====
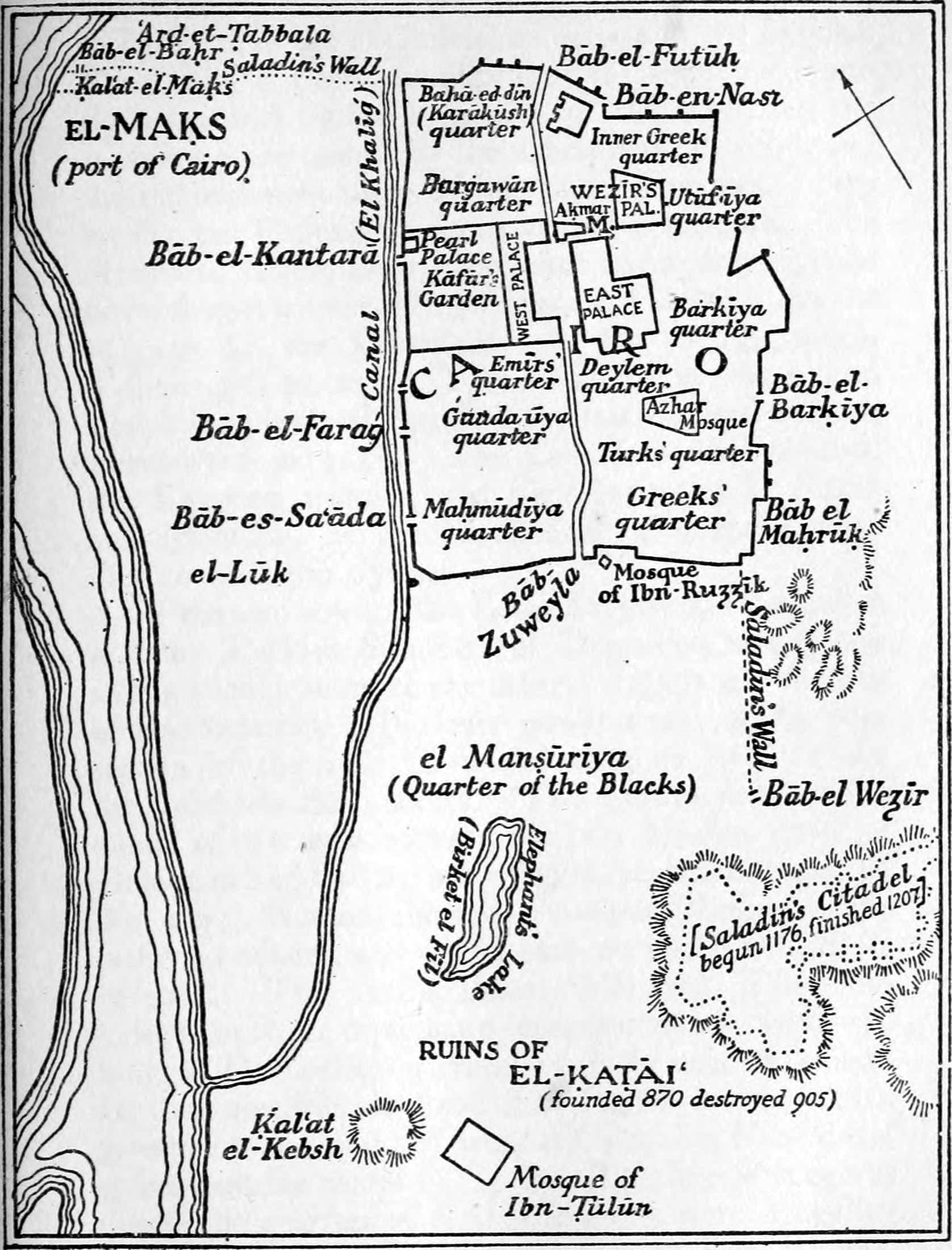
A plan of Fatimid-era Cairo, as reconstructed by Stanley Lane-Poole, showing the approximate layout of the city and the location of the palaces

Increasingly ill and indisposed, al-Afdal came to rely greatly on al-Bata'ihi, who immediately launched a series of reforms. Indeed, the speed with which these were carried out could indicate, according to historian Michael Brett, that he had prepared and proposed them in advance to al-Afdal, which is why he was then chosen for his high post. The first reform arose from the discrepancy between the lunar Hijri year, which was used for tax purposes, and the solar year, which determined the actual harvest time and was longer by eleven days. The discrepancy meant that every 33 years, an entire nominal year's harvest was missing as the lunar year was ahead of the solar one. In August/September 1107 al-Bata'ihi ordered a tahwil ('conversion'), which brought the accounting year AH 499 (1105/6 CE) in line with the actual year AH 501 (1107/8 CE)—the multi-year gap indicating that this necessary adjustment had been neglected for considerable time in the past.

At the same time, al-Bata'ihi ordered a new cadastral survey (rawk), which likewise was supposed to take place every thirty years, in order to bring the assessed land tax (kharaj) in line with the actual agricultural capacity of the estates. This was a problem particularly affecting the army, since its pay was in the form of land grants (iqta'at), to the proceeds of which the soldiers held rights in exchange for acting as tax farmers for the government. As land value changed over time, many of the lower-ranking soldiers, with lower-value grants, had seen their income reduced over time, while the senior commanders' higher-value estates were usually generating much more income than they were sending as taxes to the fisc, attracting more cultivators as well as benefiting from improvements and investments by their wealthier holders. Al-Bata'ihi's reform annulled all previous land grants, got the lower-ranking soldiers to bid high sums for the lands previously held by the senior-ranking ones, and even convinced the latter to bid for the lower-value grants by allowing them to pay only according to their own valuation, thus far below the original assessment. Al-Bata'ihi's son, writing about it a few decades later, maintains that it was a resounding success that was concluded to general satisfaction, and increased state income by 50,000 gold dinars. (Note: By way of comparison, in 1124 King Baldwin II of Jerusalem was ransomed from captivity for 80,000 dinars.)

==== New Nile canal and observatory ====
Related to his reform of the tax system were two major infrastructure projects undertaken by al-Bata'ihi: a new canal in the eastern Nile Delta and a new observatory near Cairo. Following complaints by the local tax-farmer, Ibn al-Munajja, (Note: Despite al-Afdal's orders to name it "al-Afdali" after himself, already at its completion it was known as the canal of Ibn al-Munajja; it still appears as 'Abou el-Meneggueh' in the Description de l'Égypte.) that the province of Sharqiyya was suffering from lack of water, which reduced its tax yields, a new canal was constructed in 1113–1115, after al-Afdal and al-Bata'ihi inspected the area in person. The enterprise proved very costly, which resulted in al-Afdal ordering the imprisonment of Ibn al-Munajja, but the canal's opening was celebrated with much pomp, with Caliph al-Amir taking part in the ceremonies in person.

The observatory project was related to the precise calculation of the calendar; two different astronomical tables (zij) were in use in Egypt at the time, one calculated in the 9th century by al-Khwarizmi and the other in the early 11th century by Ibn Yunus, on behalf of the Fatimid caliph al-Hakim (r. 996–1021). The two were not in agreement, and furthermore both had drifted from actual observations. The construction of an observatory south of Cairo had already begun in 1012, but abandoned thereafter. Work began in 1119 on a hill south of the cemetery of al-Qarafa, where the small Mosque of the Elephant was located. The affair turned into a fiasco: costs skyrocketed, especially for the large, and difficult to cast, bronze rings used for observations. Even when the latter were successfully cast and installed, it turned out that the Muqattam Hills actually blocked the view of the sun during sunrise; the whole apparatus had to be transported to a new site on the Muqattam itself. Several scholars were involved with the project, including the Andalusi Abu Ja'far ibn Hasday, the qadi and geometer Ibn Abi'l-Ish of Tripoli, the instrument-maker Abu'l-Naja ibn Sind of Alexandria, and the geometer Abu Muhammad Abd al-Karim of Sicily. Construction was interrupted by al-Afdal's death in 1121, and when al-Bata'ihi, upon being appointed to the vizierate, ordered it resumed, the apparatus was laboriously moved to the Bab al-Nasr gate. This too would remain unfinished: after al-Bata'ihi's downfall in 1125, Caliph al-Amir ordered the materials dismantled and the workers and scholars dispersed.

=== Vizierate ===
==== Rise to power ====
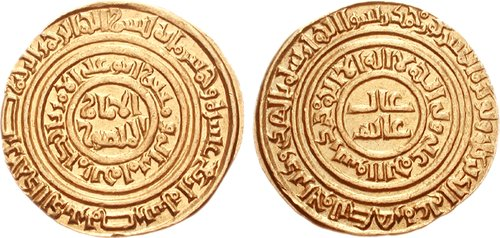
Gold dinar of al-Amir, minted in Cairo in AH 514 (1119/20 CE)

Al-Afdal was murdered by unknown assailants on 11 December 1121, on the eve of the Eid al-Fitr. The deed was officially blamed on agents of the rival Nizari Isma'ili branch and its Order of Assassins, (Note: A list of Nizari assassination victims from Alamut also claims responsibility for al-Afdal's death.) but both medieval historians (Note: The contemporary Syrian chronicler Ibn al-Qalanisi directly accuses al-Amir, while the 15th-century historian Ibn Taghribirdi claims that al-Amir ordered the assassination in response to al-Afdal attempting to poison him.) and modern scholars are skeptical: given his own resentment at the subordinate figurehead role to which al-Afdal had relegated him, al-Amir is suspected of having been the true instigator of the assassination. The sources that blame al-Amir for al-Afdal's murder also implicate the ambitious al-Bata'ihi in the deed, or at least in concealing al-Afdal's death until al-Amir could arrive at the vizieral palace to designate al-Bata'ihi as al-Afdal's successor.

After supervising the transfer of al-Afdal's enormous treasures to the caliphal palace, al-Bata'ihi was formally proclaimed vizier on 13 February 1122, and given the honorific al-Ma'mun ('the trusted one'), by which he is known. He received the titles of al-Sayyid al-Ajall ('most illustrious lord'), Taj al-Khilafah ('Crown of the Caliphate'), Izz al-Islam ('Glory of Islam'), Fakhr al-Anam ('Glory of Mankind'), and Nizam al-Din ('Order of the Faith'). Al-Bata'ihi's appointment was necessary to ensure continuity in government, as al-Amir had been excluded from its affairs and was unfamiliar with its intricacies. Al-Bata'ihi formally assumed the same plenipotentiary powers that al-Afdal had possessed, and even a unique honour that had been denied to his two predecessors: state officials appointed by him took the nisba al-Ma'muni, instead of al-Amiri after the reigning caliph. The caliph, a poor preacher, also delegated the duty of holding the Friday sermon to his vizier.

Nevertheless, al-Bata'ihi's position was much weaker vis-à-vis the caliph than his old master's. Under al-Afdal, al-Amir and his father, al-Musta'li (r. 1094–1101), before him had been confined in the caliphal palaces, while al-Afdal arrogated most public caliphal functions to himself. After al-Afdal's death, al-Amir now enjoyed a far more prominent public role, and he henceforth had a voice in government. Most importantly, al-Amir ensured that all tax income and precious textiles would be kept in the caliphal palace, and distributed from there. As the historian Michael Brett writes, "The relationship itself was one of alliance, in which the minister was entrusted as before with the responsibilities of government, in return for bringing the monarch out from his seclusion into the public eye". The changed balance of power was apparent to al-Bata'ihi, who sought to safeguard his position. According to his son Musa, the vizier had al-Amir sign a document pledging to communicate any denunciations or accusations directly to him. The document was to be valid until al-Bata'ihi's death, and the caliph furthermore undertook to look after the vizier's offspring after that.

==== Domestic policies ====
Under al-Bata'ihi, the number and splendor of public festivals and ceremonial occasions, much curtailed by al-Afdal, increased again, with the frequent and active participation of the caliph and the court. Al-Bata'ihi restored the celebrations of the birthdays of Muhammad (the mawlid al-nabi), Ali, Fatima, and of the 'Present Imam' (al-imam al-hadir, i.e., al-Amir), that according to a—second-hand and not entirely reliable—report deriving from the work of al-Bata'ihi's son, had been abolished by al-Afdal. The festival of Ghadir Khumm was also re-instituted after almost a century, as were the four 'nights of illuminations' (layali al-waqud), during which Cairo and Fustat (Old Cairo) were festively illuminated. According to the historian Michael Brett, the resumption of the festivals and their lavish celebration served a double purpose: an ideological one, signalling a return to the Fatimid dynasty's Alid legacy in an attempt to "renew its image as the champion of Islam", and a political one, as many of the festivals now were celebrated in Fustat as well as Cairo, serving to integrate the more populous metropolis with the Fatimid palace-city, which in recent decades had been colonized by people from Fustat.

All this entailed an enormous cost, and despite his reforms while serving under al-Afdal, it appears that tax collection was still problematic, and much uncultivated land remained so. Thus, in 1122 al-Bata'ihi remitted all tax arrears, conditioned upon a full payment of the owed sums in the future; and prohibited the re-sale of tax farms before the expiration of their contracts. Al-Bata'ihi is portrayed in the sources as a generous, just, and kind ruler, especially towards the non-Muslim population. He was a patron of scholars, and commissioned a history of the Fatimid vizierate by Ibn al-Sayrafi.

==== Building activity ====
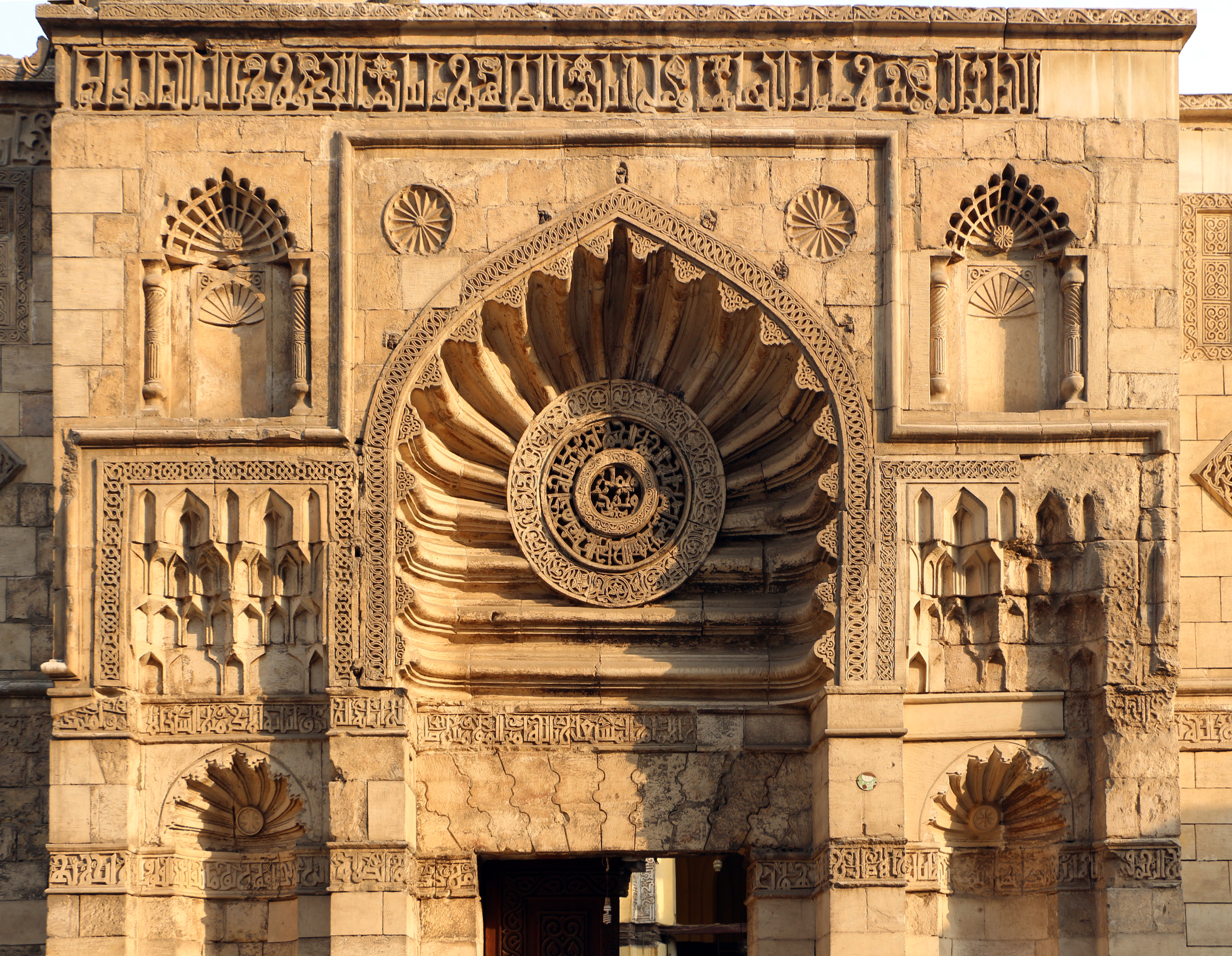
Façade of the Aqmar Mosque, Cairo

The new vizier engaged in a construction spree. New housing was erected on the long-abandoned site of the former Tulunid capital, al-Qata'i. The sprawling metropolis of Fustat was given new open spaces and a shipyard, and Cairo received a new caravanserai for merchants, a new mint (dar al-darb), and a new vizieral palace, the Dar al-Ma'muniya. In addition, several caliphal pavilions on the banks of the Nile were restored.

As part of the policy of Alid legitimism, al-Bata'ihi is recorded as having built or restored several smaller mausolea dedicated to members of the Alid family, and specifically the Husaynid branch from which the Fatimids themselves claimed descent. These belonged to Muhammad al-Ja'fari (likely a son of the 8th-century Shi'a imam Ja'far al-Sadiq, father of the Isma'il who gave his name to the Isma'ili Shi'a), al-Qasim Abu Tayyib (a grandson of al-Sadiq), and al-Qasim's daughter, Kulthum. Two further mausolea belonged to a sayyida Atika, whose exact identity is uncertain, but possibly was a 7th-century Meccan noblewoman, and to a sayyida Zaynab. Al-Bata'ihi is also known to have built several smaller and larger mosques across Egypt, although, as the art historian Jonathan M. Bloom writes, "it is unclear whether the number represents an absolute increase or simply an increase in the quality and quantity of information" available about his activities, as more, and more detailed, sources survive about his tenure than for his immediate predecessors.

The only surviving of the mosques commissioned by al-Bata'ihi was the Aqmar Mosque, constructed on the main north–south thoroughfare of Cairo, near the caliphal palace, in 1122–1125. It is notable particularly for its lavish and unusual façade, "perhaps the most beautiful ensemble of Fatimid stonework to survive", according to Bloom. The mosque's prime location, elaborate decoration, and the prominent foundation inscriptions that mention not only the reigning caliph (al-Amir) and his vizier (al-Bata'ihi), but also al-Amir's father, al-Musta'li, have led to various modern interpretations of the decorative motifs and inscriptions as an intentional political and religious statement of Fatimid-Ismai'ili orthodoxy. Due to its small size, the Aqmar Mosque was likely intended to be used mostly by the caliphal court; it does not seem to have otherwise played a particular role in Fatimid ceremonies.

==== Anti-Nizari measures ====
In the aftermath of the assassination of al-Afdal, the Nizari threat was a paramount concern. The Nizaris, adherents of the succession of al-Amir's uncle, Nizar, as caliph and imam in place of al-Musta'li, were implacably hostile to the regime in Cairo, and had established a widespread network of agents. Reports received in Cairo claimed that the chief Nizari leader, Hasan-i Sabbah, celebrated al-Afdal's murder and awaited the same fate for al-Amir and al-Bata'ihi. In response, the vizier ordered background checks for provincial officials, merchants, and residents of Cairo and Ascalon (the last major Fatimid stronghold in the Levant and main entrepot for Egypt); a further ban on moving residence was enacted in Cairo, and an extensive network of spies was recruited, including many women. The measures bore fruit: Nizari agents were arrested and crucified, and several couriers bearing money sent by Hassan-i Sabbah to fund his network in Egypt were intercepted.

To further undermine the Nizari cause, in December 1122 a meeting of officials was convened in Cairo in which the Nizari claims were publicly denounced, and the legitimacy of the succession of al-Musta'li affirmed, by none other than a woman (presented sitting behind a veil) identified as Nizar's only sister. A proclamation to that effect, the al-Hidaya al-Amiriyya, was issued on this occasion, publicly read from the pulpits of the mosques, and then sent to the Nizari communities in Persia.

==== Foreign policy ====
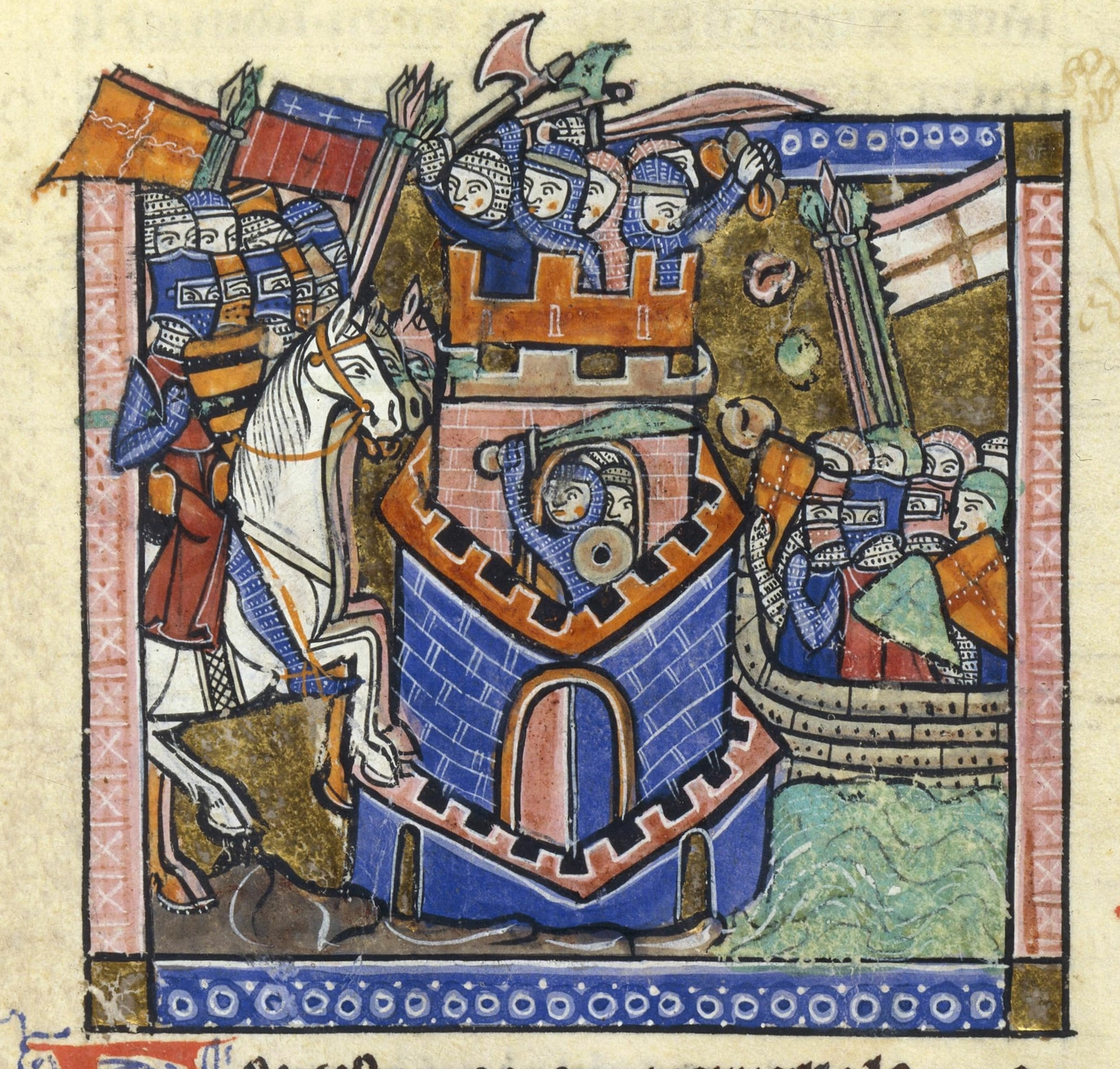
The siege of Tyre by the Crusaders, from a 13th-century French manuscript

Immediately after coming to power, in 1122, al-Bata'ihi achieved a foreign policy success, with the peaceful recovery of the Levantine port city of Tyre. Tyre nominally still belonged to the Fatimid realm, but was actually ruled by a governor installed by Toghtekin, the Sunni Turkish ruler of Damascus; the regime of the current governor, Mas'ud, was oppressive, and the populace complained to Cairo. The Fatimid navy was sent to Tyre, Mas'ud was allowed to come on board and arrested, and the city returned to Fatimid rule. This triumph however meant the rupture of relations with Damascus, and proved short-lived. In autumn of the same year, a Venetian fleet under Doge Domenico Michiel came to support the Crusader states of the Levant. Al-Bata'ihi's brother, Haydara, who was governor of Alexandria, managed to thwart the initial Venetian raids on the Nile Delta, but on 30 May 1123, the Venetians defeated the Fatimid fleet off Ascalon, and the Fatimid army sent to capture Jaffa was routed by the Crusaders at the Battle of Yibneh. With Tyre now again cut off and in danger of falling to the Crusaders, the Fatimids had to accept renewed Turkish control; left unsupported, the city capitulated to the Kingdom of Jerusalem in July 1124. In 1123, Haydara and al-Bata'ihi also had to confront an invasion of Luwata Berbers from the west. The Fatimids managed to defeat them and force them to pay tribute.

Under al-Bata'ihi, the Fatimids became more actively involved in Yemen, where the Sulayhid queen Arwa (r. 1067–1138) ruled the last major remaining pro-Fatimid, Musta'li Isma'ili community outside Egypt. Already in 1119 an envoy, Ali ibn Ibrahim ibn Najib al-Dawla, had been sent to bring the Yemeni Isma'ilis into closer alignment with Cairo; after al-Afdal's death and the rise of al-Bata'ihi, the Fatimid engagement in Yemen intensified further, with the dispatch of military forces. With their backing, Ibn Najib al-Dawla began to pursue his own policies, increasingly ignoring Queen Arwa and the local chieftains allied to the Fatimids. This led to suspicion and then resistance from the Yemeni magnates, which came into the open after the loss of most of the Fatimid army in a failed attempt to capture Zabid in 1124. The magnates began to conspire against Ibn Najib al-Dawla, besieged him at the fortress of al-Janad, and warned Cairo that he was engaged in Nizari propaganda and was even minting coins with the name of Nizar instead of al-Amir; fake coins to that effect were even sent to the Fatimid court. The affair ended after the downfall of al-Bata'ihi, with the deposition of Ibn Najib al-Dawla and his forcible return to Cairo, where he was publicly humiliated and then thrown in prison.

=== Downfall and death ===
On 3 October 1125 al-Amir suddenly ordered al-Bata'ihi, his brother Haydara al-Mu'taman, and his chief aides arrested. Various reasons were put forward for this: that al-Amir did not forgive al-Bata'ihi the loss of Tyre; that the head of the chancery, Ibn Abi Usama, convinced al-Amir that the vizier conspired with Ja'far, al-Amir's only full brother, to depose him; or that al-Bata'ihi was the true instigator of the fake Nizari coinage struck in Yemen. The truth is rather that al-Amir had begun resenting the power of his over-mighty vizier, whose self-aggrandizing tendencies were evident in his zeal to name things after himself rather than the reigning caliph. This was especially so with the observatory begun by al-Afdal: rumours circulated that al-Bata'ihi wanted to use it to predict the future or perform magics, and his ambition to name it after himself was considered proof that he aspired to rulership. The vizier was also a victim of his own policies: unlike Badr and al-Afdal, who relied on the support of the army, al-Bata'ihi lacked a power base of his own, and was dependent on the caliph as his patron, At the same time, the revival of al-Amir's public role, lavishly orchestrated by al-Bata'ihi himself, only served to strengthen the caliph's authority and self-confidence towards his vizier. Finally, the pledge extracted by al-Ma'mun from the caliph, intended to safeguard him, may have backfired, as al-Amir perceived it as a personal humiliation. Indeed, after al-Bata'ihi's imprisonment, al-Amir would rule for the remainder of his life without a vizier. Haydara died in prison, but al-Bata'ihi was executed along with Ibn Najib al-Dawla on the night of 19/20 July 1128.

== Sources ==
- al-Imad, Leila S. (1990). The Fatimid Vizierate (979–1172). Berlin: Klaus Schwarz Verlag. ISBN 3-922968-82-1.
- Behrens-Abouseif, Doris (1992). "The Façade of the Aqmar Mosque in the Context of Fatimid Ceremonial". Muqarnas. 9: 29–38. doi:10.2307/1523133. JSTOR 1523133.
- Bloom, Jonathan M. (2007). Arts of the City Victorious: Islamic Art and Architecture in Fatimid North Africa and Egypt. New Haven and London: Yale University Press. ISBN 978-0-300-13542-8.
- Brett, Michael (2017). The Fatimid Empire. The Edinburgh History of the Islamic Empires. Edinburgh: Edinburgh University Press. ISBN 978-0-7486-4076-8.
- Dunlop, D. M. (1960). "al-Baṭāʾiḥī". In Gibb, H. A. R.; Kramers, J. H.; Lévi-Provençal, E.; Schacht, J.; Lewis, B. & Pellat, Ch. (eds.). The Encyclopaedia of Islam, Second Edition. Volume I: A–B. Leiden: E. J. Brill. pp. 1091–1092. OCLC 495469456.
- Halm, Heinz (2014). Kalifen und Assassinen: Ägypten und der vordere Orient zur Zeit der ersten Kreuzzüge, 1074–1171 [Caliphs and Assassins: Egypt and the Near East at the Time of the First Crusades, 1074–1171] (in German). Munich: C. H. Beck. doi:10.17104/9783406661648-1. ISBN 978-3-406-66163-1. OCLC 870587158.
- Kaptein, N. J. G. (1993). Muḥammad's Birthday Festival: Early History in the Central Muslim Lands and Development in the Muslim West until the 10th/16th Century. Leiden: E. J. Brill. ISBN 90-04-09452-0.
- Sajjadi, Sadeq (2015). "al-Āmir bi-Aḥkām Allāh". In Madelung, Wilferd; Daftary, Farhad (eds.). Encyclopaedia Islamica. Translated by Farzin Negahban. Brill. doi:10.1163/1875-9831_isla_SIM_0269.
- Walker, Paul E. (2011). "al-Āmir bi-Aḥkām Allāh". In Fleet, Kate; Krämer, Gudrun; Matringe, Denis; Nawas, John; Rowson, Everett (eds.). Encyclopaedia of Islam (3rd ed.). Brill Online. doi:10.1163/1573-3912_ei3_COM_23060. ISSN 1873-9830.
- Williams, Caroline (1983). "The Cult of ʿAlid Saints in the Fatimid Monuments of Cairo, Part I: The Mosque of al-Aqmar". Muqarnas. 1: 37–52. doi:10.2307/1523070. JSTOR 1523070.
- Williams, Caroline (1985). "The Cult of ʿAlid Saints in the Fatimid Monuments of Cairo, Part II: The Mausolea". Muqarnas. 3: 39–60. doi:10.2307/1523083. JSTOR 1523083.

Preceded by al-Afdal Shahanshah	Vizier of the Fatimid Caliphate; 12 December 1121 – 3 October 1125	Vacant Personal rule by Caliph al-Amir Title next held by Hizar al-Mulk Hazarmard
