= List of Assassin strongholds =

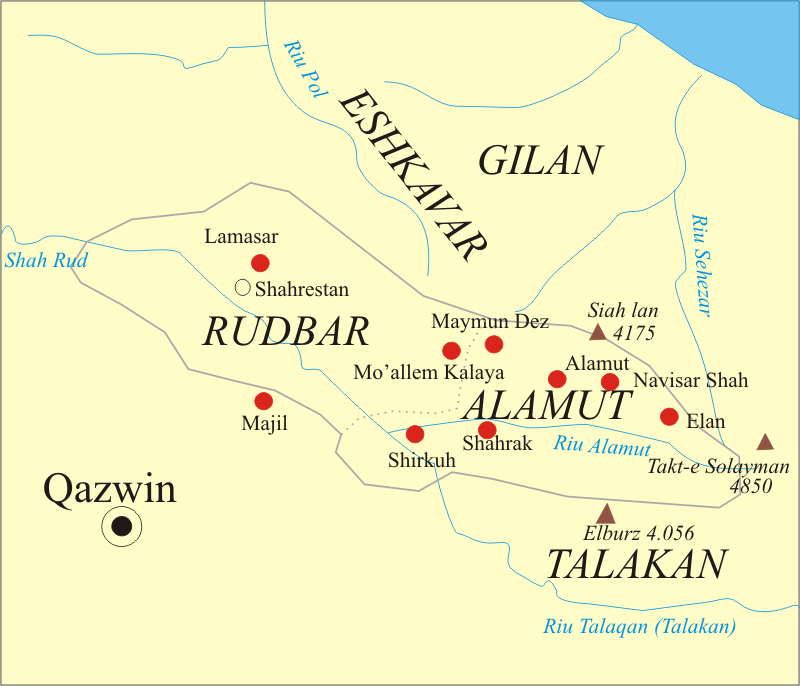
Location of several of the Ismaili castles in the regions of Alamut and Rudbar.

The Order of Assassins had several dar al-hijra (strongholds) in Persia (Iran) and Syria.

Most of the Persian Ismaili castles were in the Alborz mountains, in the regions of Daylaman (particularly, in Alamut and Rudbar; north of modern-day Qazvin) and Quhistan (south of Khurasan), as well as in Qumis. Most of the Syrian Ismaili castles were in Jabal Bahra' (Syrian Coastal Mountain Range).

According to Juzjani, before the Mongol invasion the Assassins possessed 70 forts in Quhistan and 35 in Alamut. Overall, they probably had 250 castles.

The Ismaili fortresses in Rudbar of Alamut had been built on rocky heights and were equipped to withstand long sieges; they had storehouses with high capacities and elaborate water supply infrastructure such as cisterns, qanats, and canals.

== Persia ==
Ismaili castles in Persia (Iran)
| Name | Image | Condition | Location | Present-day location | Coordinates | Notes |
|---|---|---|---|---|---|---|
| Alamut Castle (قلعه الموت) | | destroyed, partially restored | Alamut | Qazvin Province | 36°26′40.63″N 50°35′9.58″E | The capital of the Nizari state. Designated as UNESCO World Heritage Site. |
| Atashgah Castle (قلعه آتشگاه) | | Ruined | Kashmar | Razavi Khorasan Province | 35°18′59″N 58°23′10″E | |
| Lambsar, Lambasar (لمبسر), Lamsar, Lamasar (لمسر), Lanbasar (لنبمسر) | | in ruins | Alamut | Qazvin Province | 36.5476°N 50.2273°E | Designated as UNESCO World Heritage Site. Captured, refortified, and governed by Kiya Buzurg-Ummid. Probably the largest Nizari castle. |
| Rudkhan Castle (قلعه رودخان) | | rebuilt | Daylam | | 37.064357°N 49.239276°E | |
| Maymun-Diz (میمون‌دز), Meymundezh (میمون‌دژ) | N/A | destroyed and lost | Rudbar | Qazvin Province | | Destroyed by the Mongols in 1256. |
| Semiran castle (قلعه سمیران) | | in ruins | Tarem | Qazvin Province | 36°44′34.56″N 49°13′44.6″E | |
| Nevizar Shah Castle (قلعه نویزر شاه), Navisar/Nevisar Shah Castle (قلعه نویسر شاه) | | | Rudbar | Qazvin Province | | Designated as UNESCO World Heritage Site. The highest castle in Rudbar. |
| Qostin-Lar Castle (قلعه قسطین‌لار) | | | Rudbar | Qostin-Lar village, Qazvin Province | | Designated as UNESCO World Heritage Site. |
| Ilan Castle (قلعه ایلان) | | | Rudbar | Qazvin Province | | Designated as UNESCO World Heritage Site. The largest castle in Rudbar after Alamut. |
| Shams Kalayeh Castle (قلعه شمس لایه) | | | Rudbar | Moallem Kalayeh village, Qazvin Province | | Designated as UNESCO World Heritage Site. |
| Shirkuh Castle (قلعه شیرکوه) | | | Rudbar | Moallem Kalayeh village, Qazvin Province | | Designated as UNESCO World Heritage Site. |
| Mansur Kuh castle (قلعه منصورکوه), | | in ruins | Qumis | Semnan Province | | |
| Mehrnegar Castle (Damghan), Mihrnigar (قلعه مهرنگار), Mihrin/Mehrin Castle (قلعه مهرین) | | in ruins | Qumis | Damghan County | | Fell at 1253 to the Mongols. |
| Gerdkuh/Girdkuh (گردکوه), Dezh-i Gunbadan (دژ گنبدان) | | in ruins | Qumis | near Damghan | 36°09′43″N 54°09′25″E | The last Ismaili castle that surrendered to Mongols. |
| Ustunawand (استوناوند), Ostanavand (استاناوند), Ostanavand Castle of Naruheh (قلعه استاناوند ناروهه) | | | Damavand | Garmsar County | | |
| Saru castles (قلعه سارو), Soru | | mainly intact | Qumis | near Semnan | 35°41′51.23″N 53°30′27.07″E (Greater Saru) | Two nearby related castles, Greater Saru and Lesser Saru, are recently attributed to the Ismailis. |
| Mu'minabad/Mo'menabad Castle (قلعه مؤمن‌آباد), locally known as Kal Hasab Sabbah Castle (قلعه کل حسن صباح) | | | Quhistan | near Taghandik, Darmian County | 32.722778°N 59.941389°E | |
| Dara, Darah, Duruh Castle قلعه درح | | | Quhistan, near Sistan's border | Doreh, Sarbisheh County, South Khorasan | | A dependency of the Mo'menabad Castle. |
| Citadel of Takrit (قلعة تكريت) | | in ruins | | Tikrit, Iraq | | One of the few "open" Ismaili stronghold. |
| Kuh Qaen castle (قلعه قائن), Qal'eh Kuh of Qaen (قلعه کوه قائن), Husayn Qa'ini Castle (قلعه جسین قائنی) | | | Qaen, Quhistan | | 33°41′42.91″N 59°12′22.8″E | |
| Kuh Zardan Castle (قلعه کوه زردان) | | in ruins | Quhistan | Zardan, Zirkuh | 33.482863°N 59.658299°E | |
| Furg Castle (قلعه فورگ), Furk Castle (قلعه فورک) | | rebuilt | Quhistan | Darmian County | | |
| Ghal'eh Kuh of Ferdows (قلعه کوه فردوس) | | in ruins | south of Tun, Quhistan | Ferdows County | 33°54′34.49″N 58°8′9.29″E | The biggest fortress of Quhistan, per Tarikh-i Jahangushay. Burned by the invading Mongols. Connected to the Ghal'eh Kuh of Hasanabad. |
| Ghal'eh Kuh of Hasanabad (قلعه کوه حسن‌آباد), Ghal'eh Dokhtar (قلعه دختر حسن‌آباد) | | in ruins | north-west of Tun, Quhistan | Ferdows County | 34.072556°N 58.084722°E | Connected to the Ghal'eh Kuh of Ferdows. |
| Khalanjan Castle (قلعه خالنجان), Khulanjan Castle (قلعه خولنجان), Bazi Castle (قلعه بزی) | | destroyed | Khulanjan town, south of Isfahan (the exact location of the town is uncertain) | Isfahan Province | | |
| Anjudan (انجدان) | | | Anjudan | Anjudan, Markazi Province | | |
| Sa’adat-kuh (سعادت‌کوه) | | | Rudbar | | | |
| Mubarak-kuh (مبارک‌کوه) | | | | | | |
| Firuzkuh castle (قلعه فیروزکوه) (قلعه فیروزکوه) | | in ruins | Rayy | Tehran Province | | A concentric castle |
| Shah-Dizh (شاهدژ), Shahdez (شاهدز), Dizkuh (دژکوه), Dizhkuh (دژکوه) | | in ruins | near Isfahan | on Nehbandan hill, Isfahan | 32°35′48″N 51°38′38″E | Peacefully captured and refortified by Ahmad ibn Abd al-Malik ibn Attash, recaptured and destroyed by the Seljuqs |
| Kafer Ghal'eh (Sangsar) (کافر قلعه سنگسر) | fa:File:Mahdishahr_Kafar_Ghal'e.JPG | | | Mehdishahr County, Semnan Province | | |
| Hesaruiyeh (حصاروئیه) | | | | | 30°02′37″N 55°12′59″E | |
| Ghal'eh Dokhtar of Shurab (قلعه دختر شوراب) | | | Quhistan | Gonabad County, South Khorasan Province | | |
| Shir Qal'eh (شیرقلعه) | | | | near Shahmirzad, Semnan Province | 35°46′38.93″N 53°18′40.69″E | |
| Gahur Castle (قلعه گهور), Boz Qal'eh (بز قلعه) | | in ruins | | Eshtehard County, Alborz Province | | |
| Qal'eh Qela' of Mud (قلعه قلاع مود) | | | Quhistan | near Mud, Sarbisheh County, South Khorasan Province | | |
| Chimarud Castle (قلعه چیمارود) | | | | Anbuh, Gilan Province | | |
| Kalisham Castle (قلعه و پای قلعه کلیشم) | | | | Kalisham, Gilan Province | | |
| Rostam Castle of Khusf (قلعه رستم خوسف), Qal'eh Dokhtar (Khusf) (قلعه دختر (خوسف)) | | | Quhistan | Ganj village, Khusf County | | |
| Labrud Castle (قلعه لبرود) | | | Qumis | Ahvanu, Semnan Province | | |
| Arzang Castle (ارزنگ قلعه) | | | | near Pashand in Savojbolagh County, Alborz Province | | |
| Kolim Fortress (دژ کلیم), Kolim Castle (قلعه کلیم) | | | | Kolim, Poshtkuh Rural District (Semnan Province) | | |
| Mahtabi Fortress (دژمهتابی) | | | Arrajan | Behbahan County, Khuzestan Province | | |
| Gabaran castle (قلعه گبران) | | | | near Hiv, Savojbolagh County | | |
| Forud castle (قلعه فرود) | | | | Kalat, Gonabad | | |
| Arzhang Castle (قلعه ارژنگ or ارژنگ قلعه) | | | Talaqan | Minavand, Alborz Province | | |
| Mansur Castle (قلعه منصور) | | | Talaqan | | | |
| Markuh Castle (قلعه مارکوه), Marku Castle (قلعه مارکو) | | | | Ramsar County | | |
| Qal'eh Qela' of Sarayan (قلعه قلاع سرایان) | | | Quhistan | Masabi Rural District | | |
| Qal'eh Qela' of Nowzad (قلعه قلاع نوزاد) | | | Quhistan | Darmian County | | |
| Bamrud Castle (قلعه بمرود) | | | Quhistan | Bamrud, South Khorasan Province | | |
| Espahabdan Castle (قلعه اسپهبدان) | | | | Espahabdan | | |
| Qal'eh Dokhtar (قلعه دختر) | | | Kuhsorkh County | Razavi Khorasan Province | | |
| Qal'at al-Jiss (قلعة الجص) | | | Arrajan | | | |
| Qal'at Halādhān, Dez Kelat (دز کلات) | | | Arrajan | | | |
| Qal'at al-Nazir (قلعة الناظر) | | | Arrajan | | | |
| "Mor" | | | Uncertain | | | Based on the Ginanic accounts, Mor was a fortress and the place of residence of the Imam who was living in concealment. |
| Qal'eh-Dokhtar of Boshruyeh (قلعه دختر بشرویه) | | | Quhistan | Boshruyeh County | | |
| Shahanshah fortress (قلعه شهنشاه) | | | Near the town of Nih | | | Purchased from the Nasrid official of Sistan, Nasir al-Din Uthman. |

== Syria ==
The strongholds in Jabal Bahra' were known as the "Castles of the da'wa" (قلاع الدعوة qilāʿ al-daʿwah).

Ismaili castles in Syria
| Name | Arabic name / Alternative spellings | Location | Condition | Image | Coordinates | Notes |
|---|---|---|---|---|---|---|
| Qal'at Balis (Barbalissos) | قلعة بالس | on the Aleppo-Baghdad road | | | 35°50′11.76″N 38°18′9.36″E | Ceded by Alp Arslan al-Akhras to Abu Tahir al-Sa'igh, commanded by Ibrahim al-Ajami. It was soon abandoned. |
| Baniyas (Nimrod Fortress) | قلعة بانياس | Banias, Southern Syria (modern-day Israel) | | | 33°15′10″N 35°42′53″E | Given by Toghtekin to Bahram al-Da'i |
| Masyaf Castle | قلعة مصياف | Hama | Partially restored | | 35°03′58″N 36°20′36″E | The most famous Syrian Ismaili castle. |
| Abu Qubays | قلعة أبو قبيس | Hama | Partially ruined | | 35°14′5.92″N 36°19′50.83″E | Purchased from Iftikhar al-Dawla, the Fatimid governor of Jerusalem. |
| Qalaat al-Madiq | قلعة المضيق, Qal'at al-Mudiq | Hama | Residential area | | 35°25′12″N 36°23′33″E | Briefly captured by Abu Tahir al-Sa'igh. |
| Aleika Castle | قلعة العليقة, Uleyqa | Tartus (in Jabal Bahra') | | | 35°10′37″N 36°7′20″E | A concentric castle |
| Al-Qadmus Castle | قلعة القدموس, Al-Qadmous; Kadmus | Tartus (in Jabal Bahra') | Ruined | | 35°06′05″N 36°09′40″E | Purchased from Muslim forces. |
| Al-Kahf Castle | قلعة الكهف | Tartus (in Jabal Bahra') | Partially ruined | | 35°02′27″N 36°04′58″E | Probably the main residence of Rashid al-Din Sinan. He died in the castle in 1192. Ismailis had purchased the castle from Muslims in 1138. |
| Khariba Castle | قلعة الخريبة | Tartus (in Jabal Bahra') | | | 35°6′16″N 35°58′29″E | Captured by local Nizaris in 1136–1137 from the Franks. |
| Khawabi Castle | قلعة الخوابي | Tartus (in Jabal Bahra') | Residential area | | 34°58′22″N 36°00′06″E | Conquered by Baibars in 1273. |
| Rusafa Castle | قلعة الرصافة | Hama (in Jabal Bahra') | Partially ruined | | 35°2′15″N 36°18′00″E | Rebuilt by Sinan. Conquered by Baibars in 1271. |
| Qulay'ah Castle | قلعة القليعة | Tartus (in Jabal Bahra') | | | 34°56′52″N 36°15′30″E | |
| Sarmin Castle | قلعة سرمين | Idlib | | | 35°54′7″N 36°43′26″E | |
| Maniqa Castle | قلعة المنيقة | Latakia (in Jabal Bahra') | | | 35°14′5″N 36°5′46″E | Dated back to the Roman era, it was also known as "Malikas" or "Malghanes" during the Crusader rule. |
| Shaizar Castle | قلعة شيزر | Hama (in Jabal Bahra') | In ruins | | 35°16′04″N 36°34′00″E | Briefly occupied by the Assassins |

== See also ==
- Nizari Ismaili state
- History of Nizari Ismailism
- List of castles in Iran
- List of castles in Syria
- List of Crusader castles
- Baltit Fort, used by Ismailis of the Hunza princely state in Pakistan
- Muhammad I Tapar's anti-Nizari campaign
- Mongol campaign against the Nizaris
