= Saru Castles =

- قلعه‌های سارو
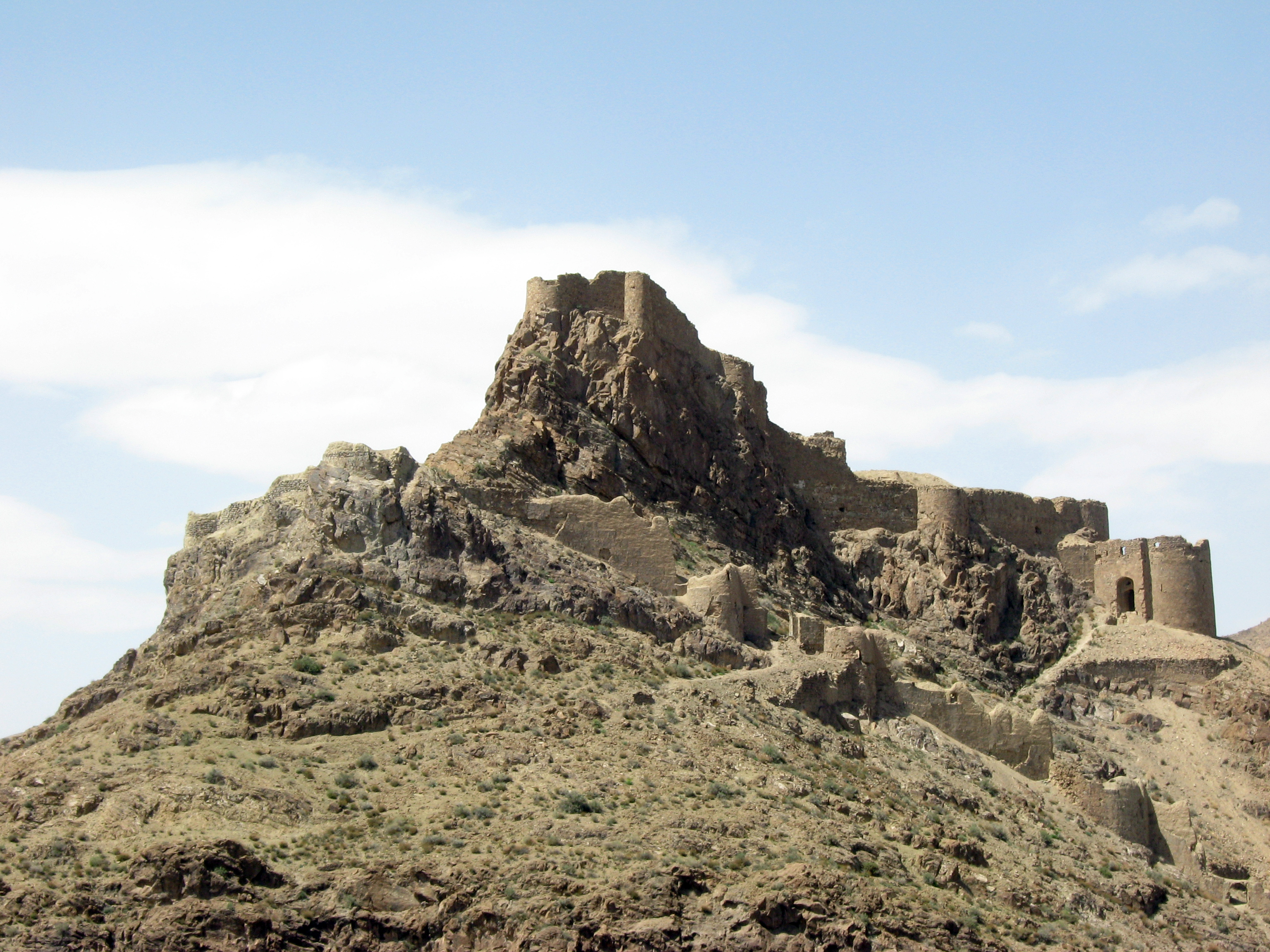
- The Greater Saru Castle
- Interactive map of the Saru Castles area

General information
- Type: Castle
- Architectural style: Ismaili
- Location: Semnan, Iran

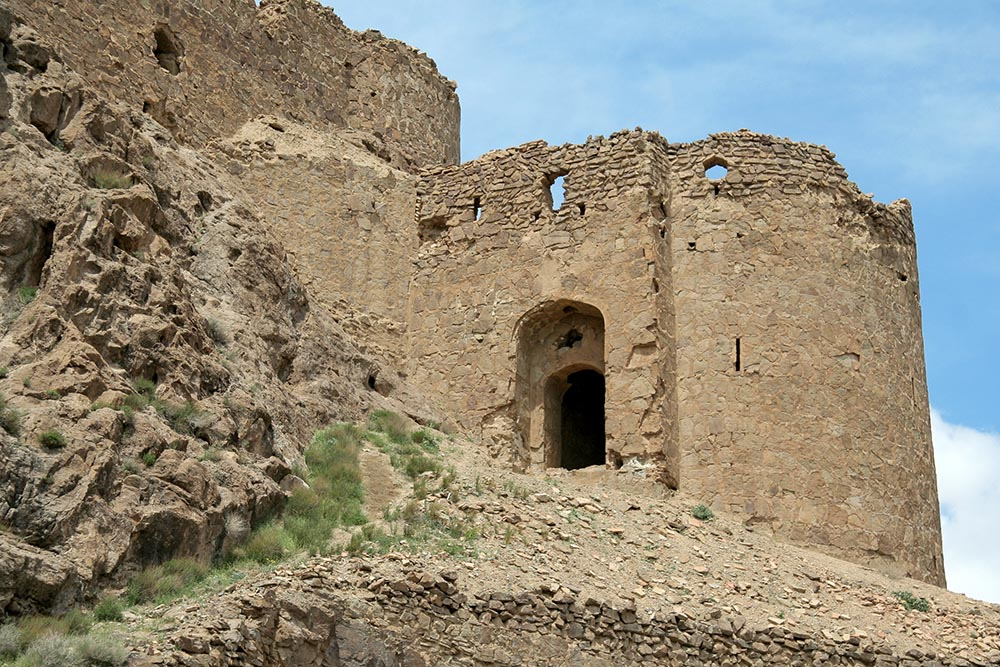
One of the gates

Saru Castles (Persian: قلعه‌های سارو; also spelled Soru, Persian pronunciation: [sɒːˈɾuː]) are two related fortifications located at 10 km in north east of the city of Semnan, Iran, on mountains of south and north of a valley called Kalāteh Sārū (کلاته سارو, literally "Saru Castle") or Mazra'eh-ye Sārū (مزرعه سارو, "Saru Farm"). The northern castle, the Lesser Saru (ساروی کوچک), is mostly in ruins. The southern castle, the Greater Saru (ساروی بزرگ), or simply the Saru Castle (قلعه سارو), is the main one and is relatively intact. It is 100 m higher than the Lesser Saru. The Greater Saru has triple defensive outer walls and an unusual double-bend main entrance way, and features a sophisticated water catchment area. The Lesser Saru was used to defend the Kalateh Saru natural springs from which water was pumped to the main castle.

The Saru Castles are believed to be used by Arsacids, Dabuyids of Tabaristan, Buyids, and eventually by the Nizari Ismailis, who built the current castle on the site of an earlier fortification. Saru is relatively understudied, and is a well-preserved case to study the architecture of the Ismaili castles. The Saru Castles are located at 80 km of Gerdkuh, another Ismaili castle of the Qumis region.

The etymology of the word Sārū (سارو) is uncertain.
