= Qumis =

Qumis may refer to:

- Kumis, a fermented dairy product
- Qumis, Iran, a historical city
- Qumis (region), a small province of medieval Islamic Persia
