= Kuh Qaen Castle =

Castle in South Khorasan Province, Iran

Kuh Qaen castle
- قلعه کوه قائن
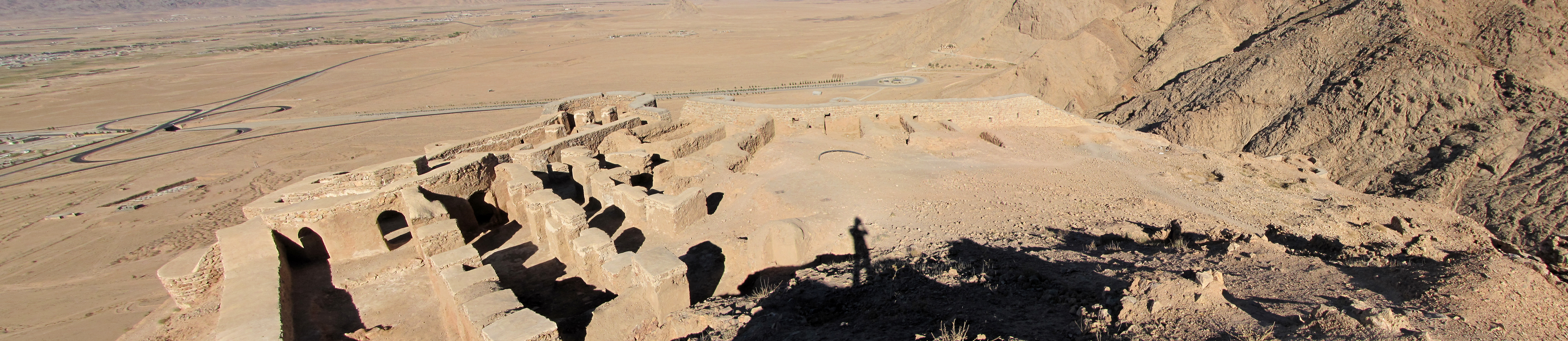
- Interactive map of the Kuh Qaen castle area

General information
- Type: Castle
- Location: Qaen, Iran

Kuh Qaen castle or Ghal'eh-Kuh of Qa'en (Persian: قلعه کوه قائن), also known as Husayn Qa'ini Castle (قلعه جسین قائنی), is a historical castle located in Qaen County in South Khorasan Province, The fortress dates back to the Ismailis of the Alamut Period. It was one of their most important strongholds in Quhistan.
