= Chimarud Castle =

Castle in Gilan Province, Iran

Chimarud castle
- قلعه چیمارود

General information
- Type: Castle
- Location: Rudbar County, Iran

Chimarud castle (Persian: قلعه چیمارود) is a historical castle located in Rudbar County in Gilan Province, The longevity of this fortress dates back to the Nizari Ismaili state.
