= Kuh Zardan Castle =

Castle in South Khorasan Province, Iran

Kuh Zardan castle
- قلعه کوه زردان
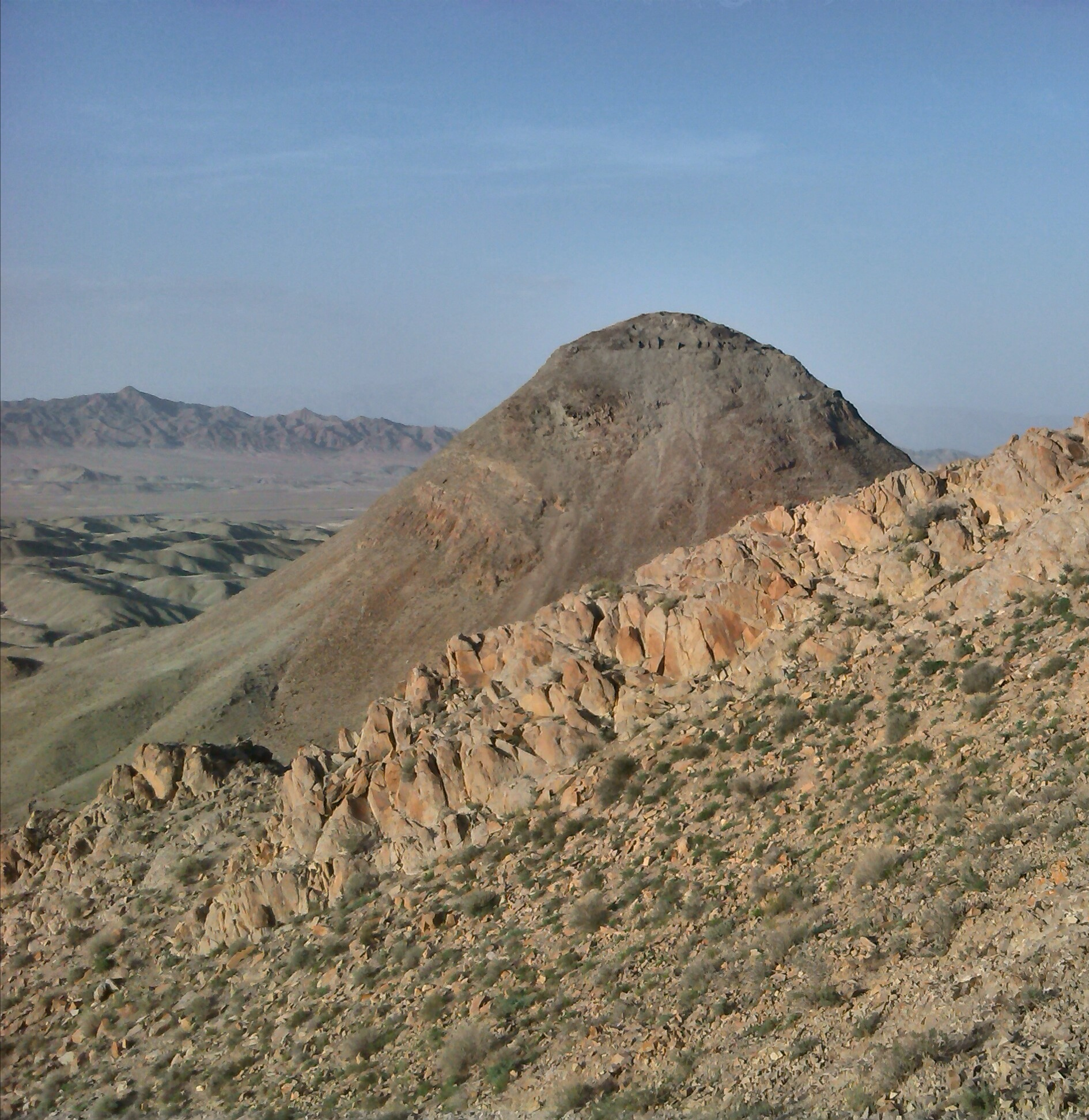
- Interactive map of the Kuh Zardan castle area

General information
- Type: Castle
- Location: Zirkuh County, Iran
- Coordinates: 33.4829°N 59.6583°E

Kuh Zardan castle or Ghal'eh Kuh of Zardan (Persian: قلعه کوه زردان) is a historical castle located in Zirkuh County in South Khorasan Province, The longevity of this fortress dates back to the Nizari Ismaili state.
