= Mongol campaign against the Nizaris =

Part of the Mongol conquest of Persia (1253–1256)

- Part of the Mongol conquest of Persia
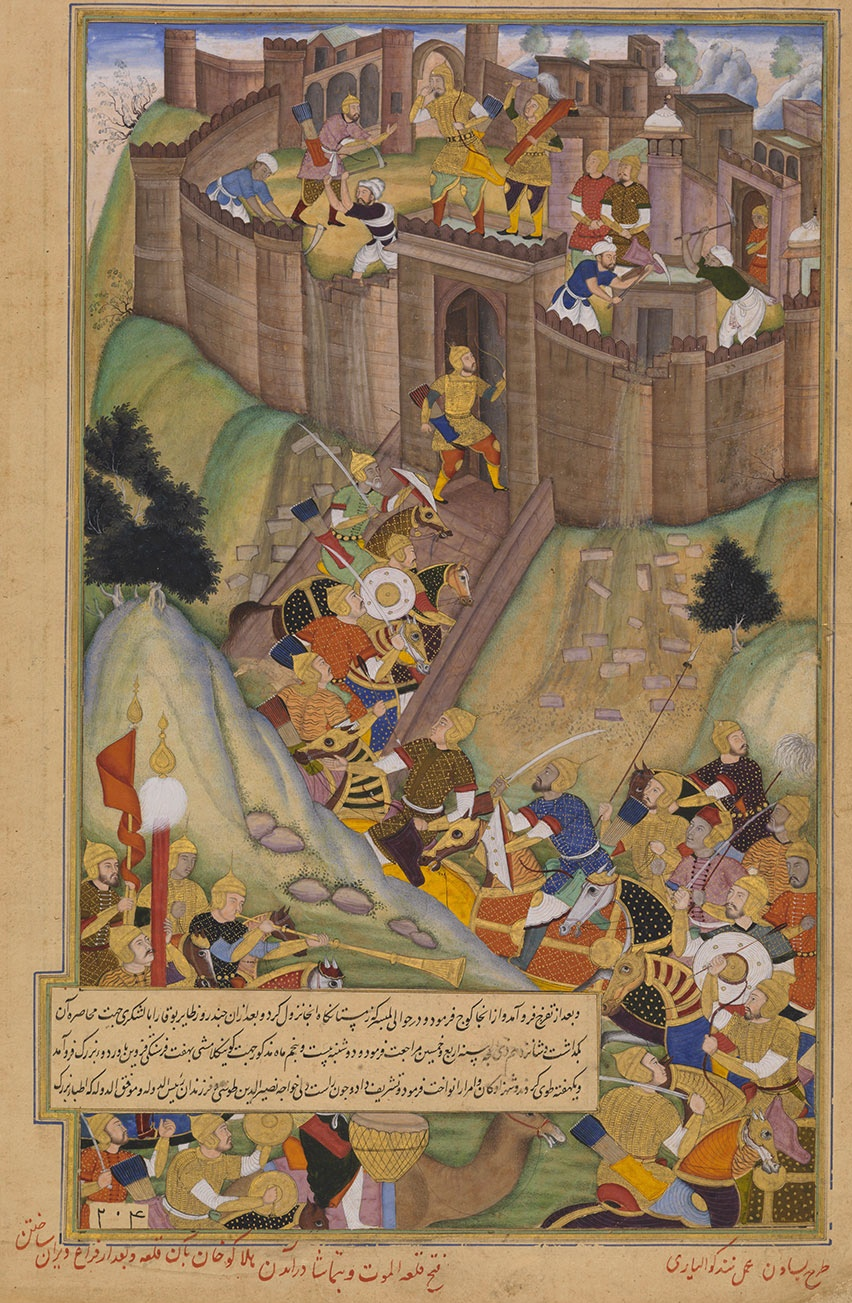
- Mughal miniature depicting the dismantling of the Alamut Castle.
Date	1253–1256
Location	Nizari strongholds in Khurasan, Quhistan, Qumis, Tarem, Rudbar, and Alamut
Result	Mongol victory

Belligerents
Mongol Empire; Oirats; Supported by the local dynasties of: Anatolia, Tabaristan, Fars, Iraq, Azerbaijan, Arran, Shirvan, Georgia, Armenia	Nizari state of Alamut (Assassins)

Commanders and leaders
Möngke Khan; Hulegu Khan; Kitbuqa; Tegüder; Buqa Temür; Köke Ilgei; Guo Kan; Quli; Balagha; Tutar; Abaqa; Yoshmut; Arghun Aqa; Büri †; Yasur	Imam Ala al-Din Muhammad; Muhtasham Nasir al-Din (surrendered); Imam Rukn al-Din Khurshah (executed); Vizier Shams al-Din Gilaki (surrendered); Khwaja Nasir al-Din al-Tusi (surrendered); Sipahsalar Muqaddam al-Din (surrendered); Qadi Tajuddin Mardanshah (surrendered)

Strength
Hülegü's army: 5 tümens (50,000 men); 1,000 squads of Chinese, Khitan, and Muslim siege engineers; Mongol garrisons in Persia	Primarily fortress garrisons

Casualties and losses
- Estimated 100,000 Nizaris massacred

The Mongols launched a campaign against the Nizari Ismaili state in 1253 after invading the Khwarazmian Empire and a series of Nizari–Mongol conflicts. The campaign was ordered by the Great Khan Möngke and was led by his brother, Hülegü. The campaign against the Nizaris and later the Abbasid Caliphate was intended to establish a new khanate in the region—the Ilkhanate.

Hülegü's campaign began with attacks on strongholds in Quhistan and Qumis amidst intensified internal dissensions among Nizari leaders under Imam Muhammad III of Alamut whose policy was to fight against the Mongols. His successor, Rukn al-Din Khurshah, began a long series of negotiations in face of the implacable Mongol advance. In 1256, the Imam capitulated while besieged in Maymun-Diz and ordered his followers to do likewise according to his agreement with Hülegü. Despite being difficult to capture, Alamut ceased hostilities too and was dismantled. The Nizari state was thus disestablished, although several individual forts, notably Lambsar, Gerdkuh, and those in Syria continued to resist. Möngke Khan later ordered a general massacre of all Nizaris, including Khurshah and his family.

Many of the surviving Nizaris were absorbed into the Ismaili communities in Western, Central, and South Asia, or assimilated into local Sunni population while practicing taqiyya. Little is known about them afterward, but their communities regain some sort of independence in their heartland of Daylam and their Imamate reappeared later in Anjudan.

== Sources ==
The main primary source is the Tarikh-i Jahangushay written by the historian Ata-Malik Juvayni, who was present in the campaign as an official under Hulegu. Juvayni has dedicated the concluding one-third of his history to this campaign, depicting it as the pinnacle of the Mongol conquest in the Muslim lands. His account contains inconsistencies and exaggerations and has been "corrected" based on other sources. Other sources include the Jami' al-Tawarikh written by Rashid al-Din Hamadani and the Tarikh-i Tabaristan by Ibn Isfandiyar.

== Background ==
The Nizaris were a branch of Ismailis, itself a branch of Shia Islam. By establishing strategic and self-sufficient mountain strongholds, they had established a state of their own within the territories of the Seljuq and later Khwarezmian empires of Persia.

In 1192 or 1193, Rashid al-Din Sinan had been succeeded by the Persian da'i Nasr al-Ajami, who restored Alamut suzerainty over the Nizaris in Syria. After the Mongol invasion of Persia, many Sunni and Shia Muslims (including the prominent scholar al-Tusi) had taken refuge with the Nizaris of Quhistan. The governor (muhtasham) of Quhistan was Nasir al-Din Abu al-Fath Abd al-Rahim ibn Abi Mansur.

== Early Nizari–Mongol relations ==
In 1221, the Nizari Imam Jalal al-Din Hasan sent emissaries to Genghis Khan in Balkh. The Imam died in the same year and was succeeded by his 9-years-old son, Ala al-Din Muhammad.

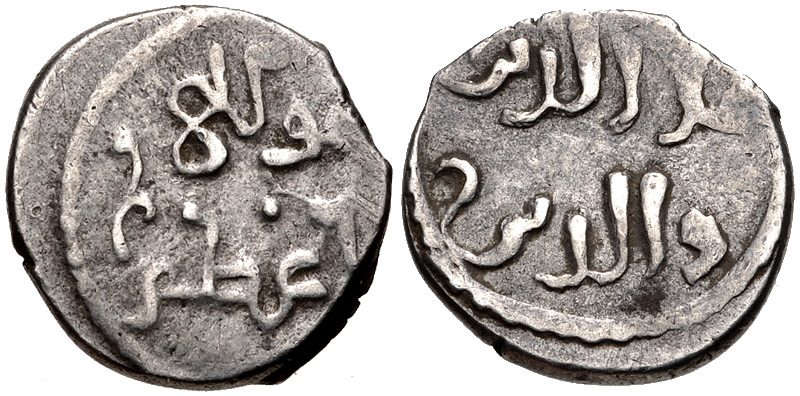
Coin of Ala al-Din Muhammad

After the fall of the Khwarezmian dynasty as a result of the Mongol invasion, direct confrontations began between the Nizaris under Imam Ala al-Din Muhammad and the Mongols under Ögedei Khan. The latter had just begun to conquer the rest of Persia. Soon the Nizaris lost Damghan in Qumis to the Mongols; the Nizaris had recently taken control of the city after the fall of the Khwarezmshahs.

The Nizari Imam sought anti-Mongol alliances as far as China, France, and England: in 1238, he and the Abbasid caliph Al-Mustansir sent a joint diplomatic mission to the European kings Louis IX of France and Edward I of England to forge a Muslim–Christian alliance against the Mongols, but this was unsuccessful. The European kings later joined the Mongols against the Muslims.

In 1246, the Nizari Imam, together with the new Abbasid caliph Al-Musta'sim and many Muslim rulers, sent a diplomatic mission under the Nizari muhtashams (governors) of Quhistan, Shihab al-Din and Shams al-Din, to Mongolia on the occasion of the enthronement of the new Mongol Great Khan, Güyük Khan. But the latter dismissed them, and soon dispatched reinforcements under Eljigidei to Persia, instructing him to dedicate one-fifth of the forces there to reduce rebellious territories, beginning with the Nizari state. Güyük himself had intended to participate but died shortly afterward. A Mongol noyan (commander), Chagatai the Elder, was reportedly assassinated by the Nizaris around this time.

Güyük's successor, Möngke Khan, began to implement the former's schemes. Möngke's decision followed anti-Nizari urges by Sunnis in the Mongol court, new anti-Nizari complaints (such as that of Shams al-Din, qadi of Qazvin), and warnings from the local Mongol commanders in Persia. In 1252, Möngke entrusted the mission of conquering the rest of Western Asia to his brother Hülegü, with the highest priority being the conquest of the Nizari state and the Abbasid Caliphate. Elaborate preparations were made, and Hülegü did not set out until 1253, and actually arrived in Persia more than two years later. In 1253, William of Rubruck, a Flemish priest sent on a mission to Karakorum in Mongolia, was struck by the security precautions there, reportedly in response to the more than forty Assassins who had been sent there to assassinate Möngke; it is possible that the assassination attempt was merely rumored.

== Hülegü's campaign ==
=== Campaign against Quhistan, Qumis, and Khurasan ===
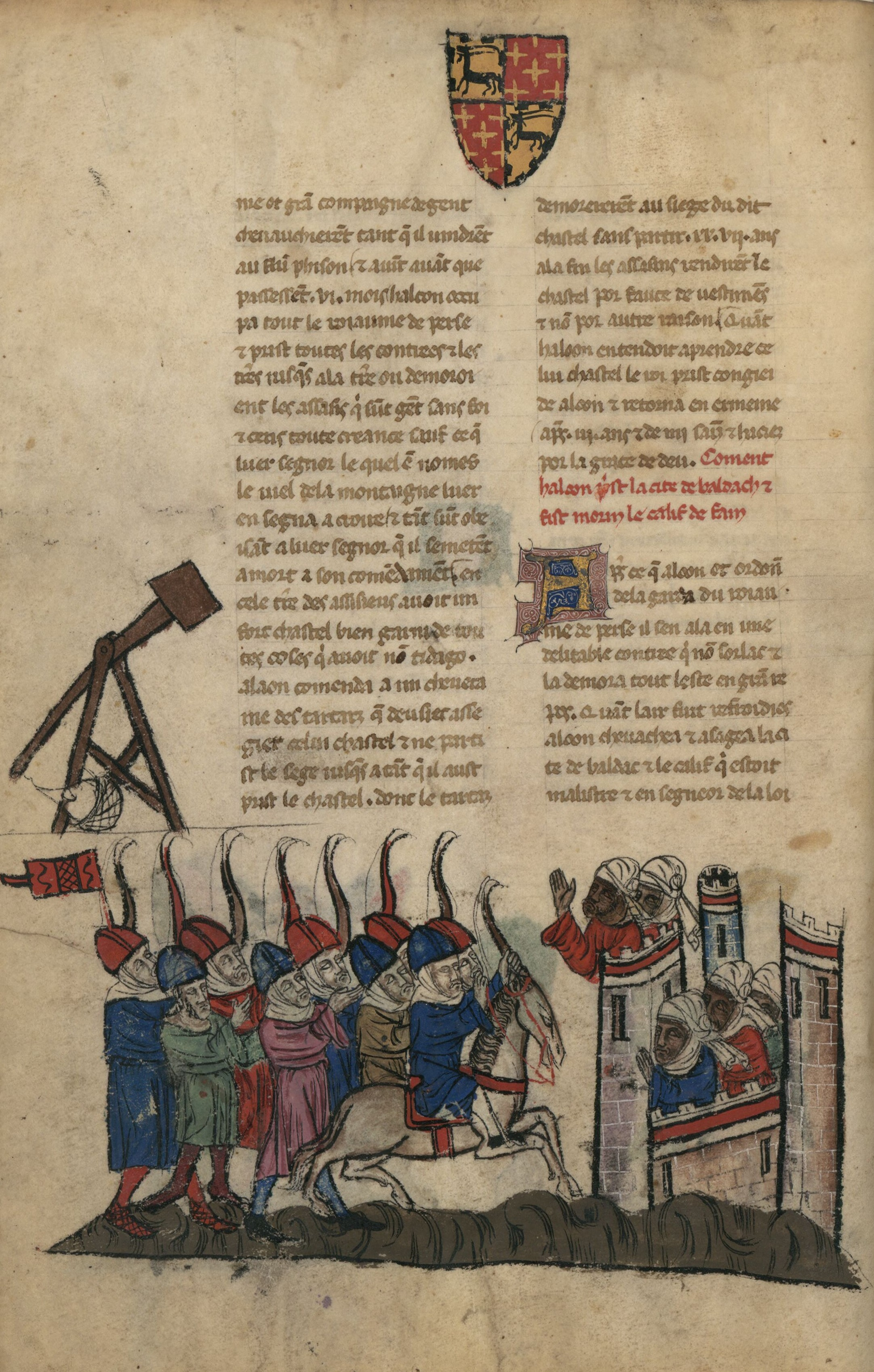
The Siege of Gerdkuh, from a manuscript of La Flor des estoires de la terre d'Orient by Hayton of Corycus. The garrison resisted for 17 years, long after the surrender of the Nizari leaders.

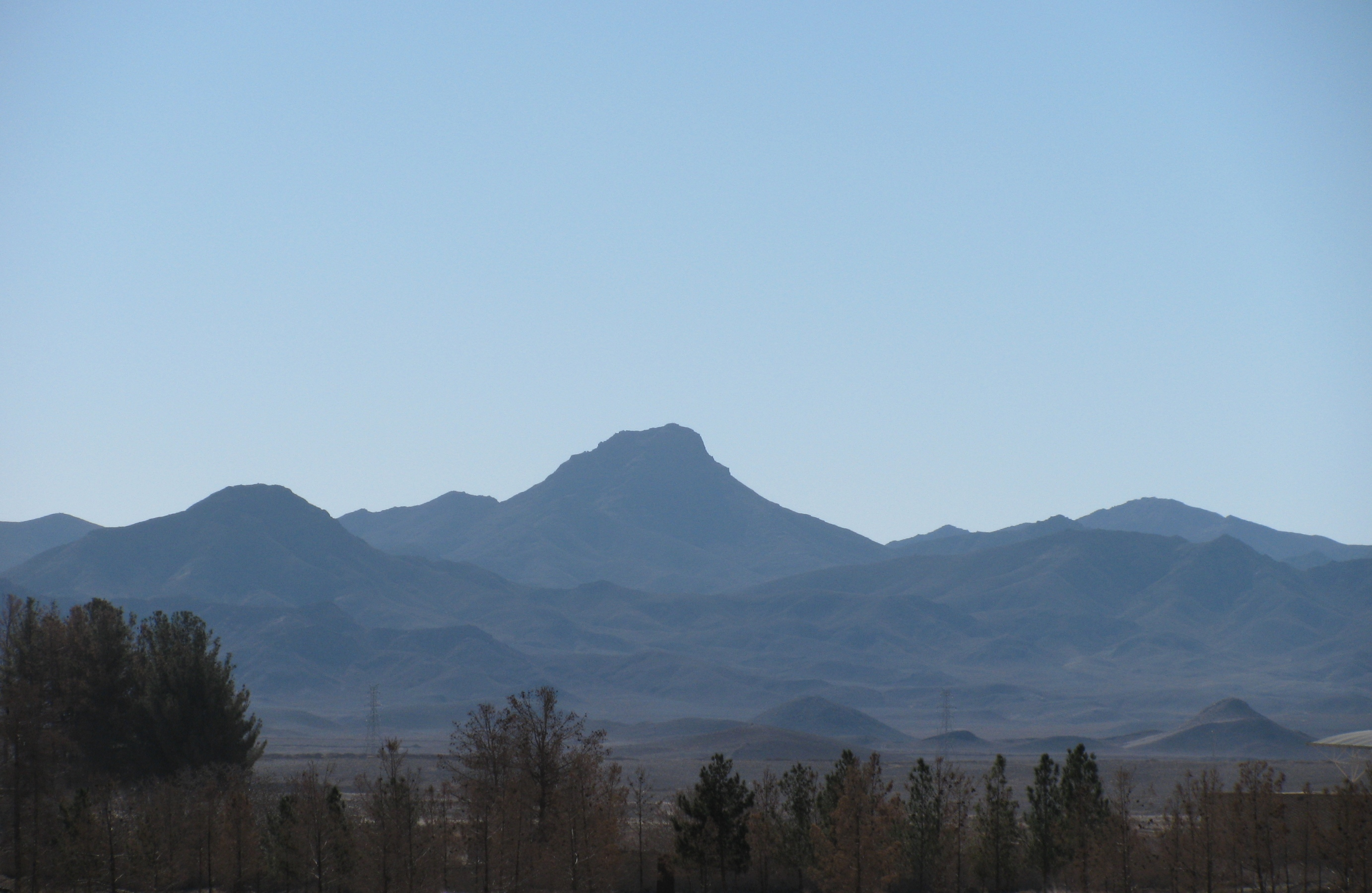
The mountain of Ghal'eh Kuh of Ferdows

In March 1253, Hülegü's advance guard under the command of Kitbuqa crossed the Oxus (Amu Darya) with 12,000 men (one tümen plus two mingghans under Köke Ilgei). In April 1253, they captured several Nizari fortresses in Quhistan and killed their inhabitants, and in May they attacked the district of Qumis and laid siege to Gerdkuh, the main Nizari stronghold there. His army consisted of 5,000 (probably Mongol) cavalrymen and 5,000 (probably Tajik) infantrymen. Kitbuqa left an army under amir Büri to besiege Gerdkuh while he attacked the nearby Mihrin (Mehrnegar) castle and Shah (in Qasran?). In August 1253, he sent raiding parties to the Tarem and Rudbar districts with little results. Afterward they attacked and slaughtered the inhabitants of the castles of Mansuriyah and Alabeshin (Aluh-neshin?).

In October 1253, Hülegü left his orda in Mongolia and began his march with a tümen at a leisurely pace, increasing his numbers as they traveled. He was accompanied by two of his ten sons, Abaqa and Yoshmut, his brother Subedei, who died en route, his wives Öljei and Yisut, and his stepmother Doquz.

In July 1253, Kitbuqa, who had been in Quhistan, pillaged, slaughtered, and, possibly temporarily, seized Tun (Ferdows) and Turshiz. A few months later, Mehrin and several other castles in Qumis fell. In December 1253, Gerdkuh's garrison boldly sallied out at night and killed a hundred Mongols, including Büri. Gerdkuh was on the verge of falling due to an outbreak of cholera, but unlike Lambsar, it survived the epidemic and was saved by the arrival of reinforcements from Alamut sent by the Imam Ala al-Din Muhammad in the summer of 1254. The fortress resisted the Mongol's siege for 17 years (see below).

In September 1255, Hülegü arrived near Samarqand. He made Kish (Shahrisabz) his temporary headquarters and sent messengers to the local Mongol and non-Mongol rulers in Persia to announce his presence as the Great Khan's viceroy. He demanded their assistance against the Nizaris and promised to destroy any who refused. In Autumn 1255, Arghun Aqa joined him. All of the rulers of Rum (Anatolia), Fars, Iraq, Azerbaijan, Arran, Shirvan, Georgia, and possibly also Armenia, acknowledged their service with many gifts.

The Mongol advances in Quhistan caused consternation among the Nizari leadership. The relationships had already deteriorated between Imam Ala al-Din Muhammad, who was reportedly afflicted by melancholia, and his advisors and Nizari leaders, as well as with his son Rukn al-Din Khurshah, the designated future Imam. According to Persian historians, the Nizari elites had planned a "coup" against Muhammad in order to replace him with Khurshah who would subsequently enter into immediate negotiations with the Mongols, but Khurshah fell ill before implementing this plan. Nevertheless, on December 1 or 2, 1255, Muhammad died under suspicious circumstances and was succeeded by Khurshah who was in his late twenties.

To reach Persia, Hülegü had entered via the Chaghatai khaganate, crossed the Oxus (Amu Darya) in January 1256, spent the winter in the meadows of Shafurqan near Balkh, and entered Quhistan in April 1256. Hülegü chose Tun, which had not been fully sacked by Kitbuqa, as his first target. An obscure incident occurred while Hülegü was passing through the Zawa and Khwaf districts which deterred him from supervising the campaign. He instructed Kitbuqa and Köke Ilgei in May 1256 to attack Tun again, which was captured after a week-long siege, after which the ramparts were destroyed and almost all its inhabitants were massacred. The Mongol commanders then regrouped with Hülegü and attacked Tus. Around this time, Hülegü received Nasir al-Din, the patron of the scholar Nasir al-Din al-Tusi and the last muhtasham in Quhistan. When asked by Hülegü why he did not bring his garrison, the muhtasham explained that the Nizaris obey only their Imam, Khurshah.

=== Campaign against Rudbar and Alamut ===
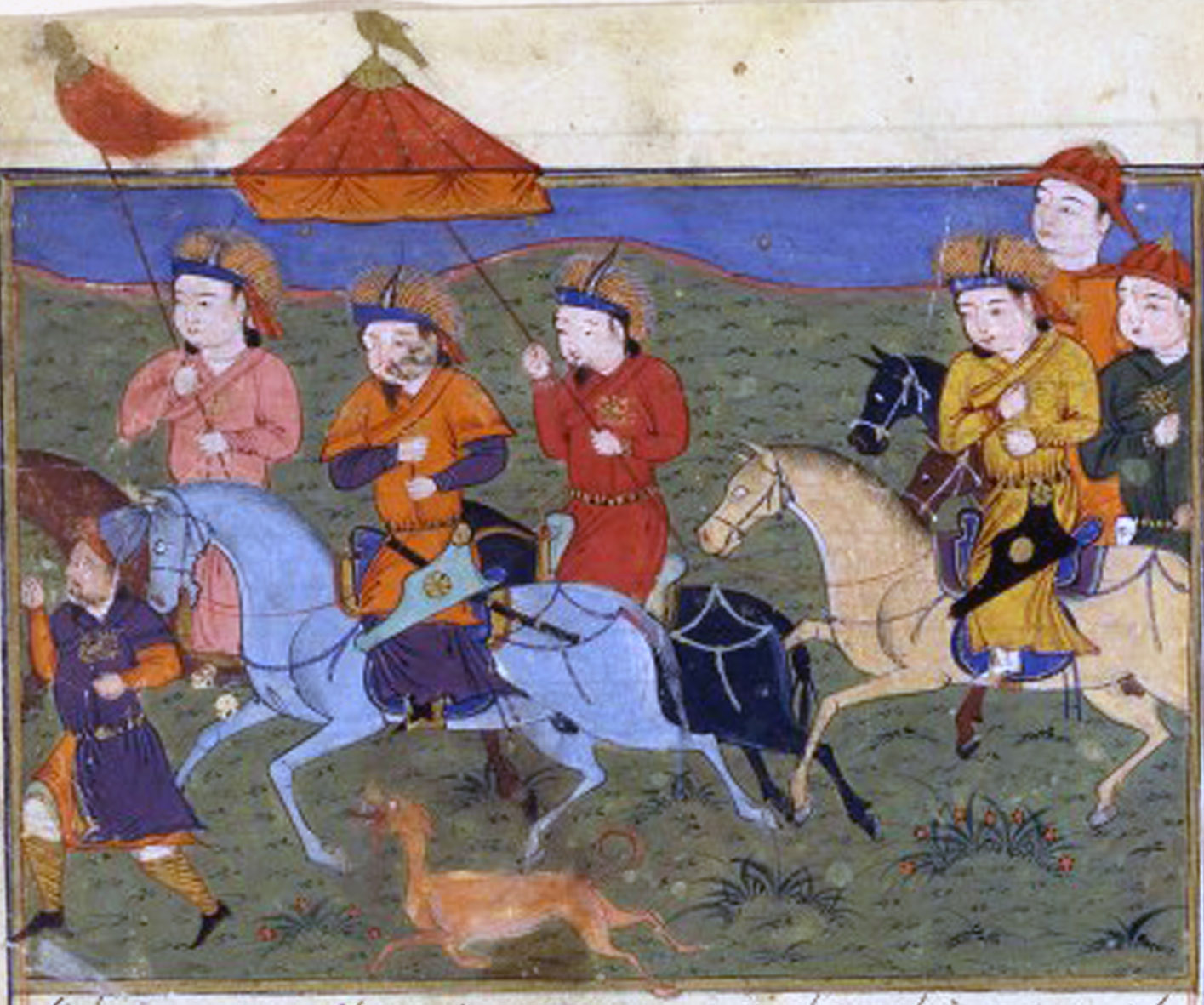
Hulegu and his army marching against the Nizari castles in 1256. Persian miniature from a manuscript of Jami al-Tawarikh

Upon taking power, Khurshah announced the Nizari leadership's willingness to submit to the Mongol rule to the nearest Mongol commander, noyan Yasur (or Yasa'ur) in Qazvin. Yasur replied that the Imam personally should visit Hülegü's camp. Skrimishes are recorded between Yasur and the Nizaris of Rudbar: on June 12, he was defeated in a battle on Mount Siyalan near Alamut, where the Nizari forces had been mustered, but managed to harass the Nizaris of the region.

As Hülegü reached Bistam, his army had enlarged into five tümens, and new commanders were added. Many of them were the relatives of Batu Khan. From the ulus of Jochi representing the Golden Horde came Quli (son of Orda), Balagha, and Tutar. The Chagatai Khanate forces were under Tegüder. A contingent of Oirat tribesmen also joined under Buqa Temür. No member of Ögedei's family is mentioned. Hülegü had with him a thousand squads of siege engineers (Chinese, Khitan and Muslim) skilled in the use of mangonels and naphtha.

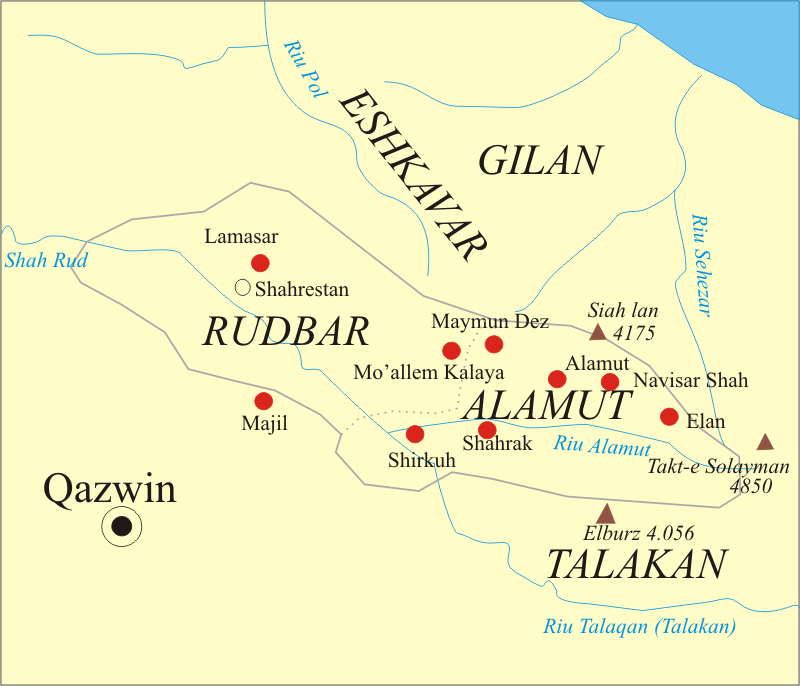
The Nizari heartland: the regions Alamut and Rudbar

In September 1256, Hulegu started the offensive against the Nizari heartland of Rudbar from three directions, and instructed all Mongol garrisons in Iraq-i Ajam to prepare for conflict. The right wing, under Buqa Temür and Köke Ilgei, marched via Tabaristan. The left wing, under Tegüder and Kitbuqa, marched via Khuwar and Semnan. The center was under Hulegu himself. Hülegü sent another warning to Khurshah, who was at the Maymun-Diz fortress playing for time. He hoped to resist long enough that the coming of winter might halt the Mongol campaigns. He sent his vizier Kayqubad to meet the Mongols in Firuzkuh and offered the surrender of all strongholds except Alamut and Lambsar, and again asked for a year's delay so Khurshah could visit Hülegü in person. Meanwhile, Khurshah ordered Gerdkuh and the fortresses of Quhistan to surrender, which their chiefs did, but the garrison of Gerdkuh continued to resist. The Mongols continued to advance and reached Lar, Damavand, and Shahdiz. In a show of good faith, Khurshah sent his 8 year old son as a hostage, but he was sent back due to his young age. Khurshah then sent his second brother Shahanshah (Shahin Shah), who met the Mongols at Abbasabad of Rey, but Hülegü demanded the dismantling of the Nizari fortifications to show his goodwill.

Numerous negotiations between the Nizari Imam and Hülegü were futile. The Nizari Imam sought to keep the main Nizari strongholds, while the Mongols were adamant that the Nizaris must fully submit.

==== Siege of Maymun-Diz ====
On 8 November 1256, Hülegü set up camp on a hilltop facing Maymun-Diz and encircled the fortress with his forces by marching over the Alamut mountains via the Taleqan valley and appearing at the foot of Maymun-Diz.

Maymun-Diz could have been attacked by mangonels; that was not the case with Alamut, Nevisar Shah, Lambsar and Gerdkuh, all of which were on top of high peaks. Nevertheless, the strength of the fortification impressed the Mongols, who surveyed it from various angles to find a weak point. Since the winter was approaching, Hülegü was advised by the majority of his lieutenants to postpone the siege, but he decided to proceed. Preliminary bombardments were performed for three days by mangonels from a nearby hilltop with casualties on both sides. A direct Mongol assault on the fourth day was repulsed. The Mongols then used heavier siege engines, hurled javelins dipped in burning pitch and set up additional mangonels all around the fortifications.

Later that month, Kuhrshah sent a message offering his surrender on the condition of the immunity of him and his family. Hülegü's royal decree was sent by Ata-Malik Juvayni, who took it personally to Khurshah, asking for his signature, but Khurshah was hesitant. After several days, Hülegü began another bombardment and on 19 November, Khurshah and his entourage descended from the fortress and surrendered. The evacuation of the fortress continued until the next day. A small part of the garrison refused to surrender and fought in a last stand in a high domed building in the fortress; they were defeated and slaughtered after three days.

The Nizari leadership's decision to surrender was apparently influenced by outside scholars such as al-Tusi.

Historians continue to debate the reasons why Alamut made no effort to assist their besieged comrades in Maymun-Diz.

==== Capitulation of Alamut ====
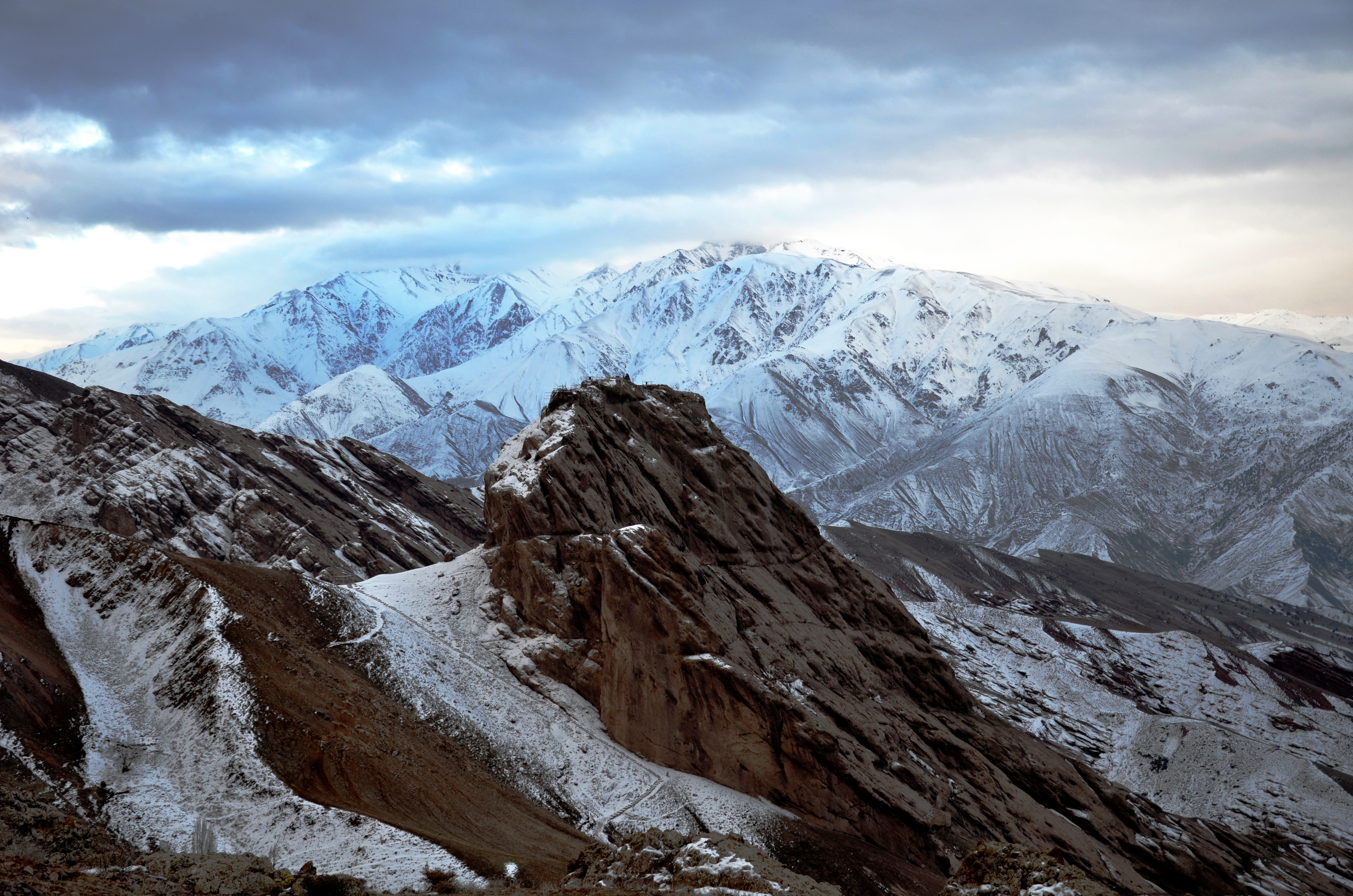
The rock of Alamut

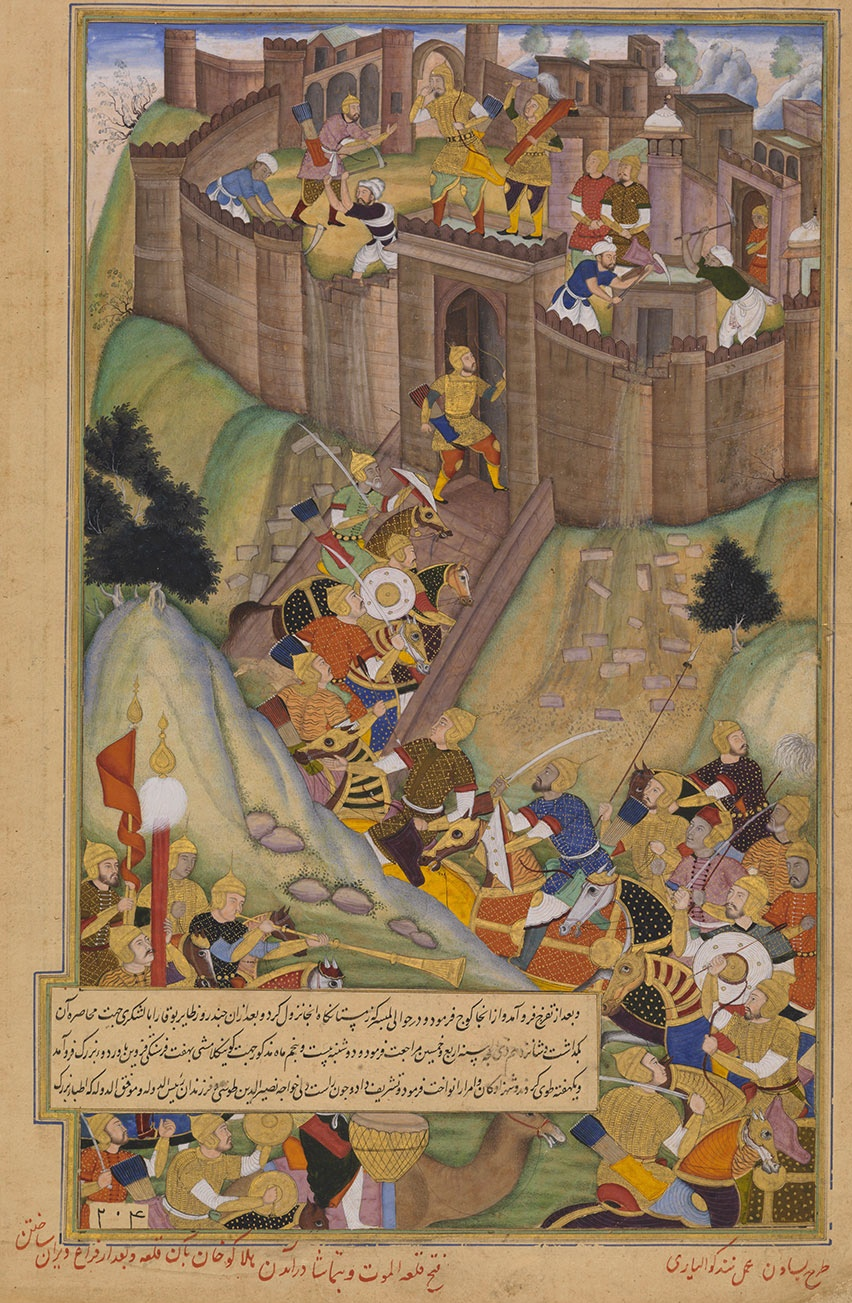
Mughal painting depicting Hülegü and the Mongols dismantling Alamut

Khurshah instructed all Nizari castles of the Rusbar valley, around 40 in total, to capitulate, evacuate, and dismantle their forts. All subsequently capitulated, except Alamut (under sipahsalar Muqaddam al-Din Muhammad Mubariz) and Lambsar, who thought the Imam had issued orders under duress and was practicing a sort of taqiyya. Despite the small size of the fortress and its garrison, Alamut was stone-built (unlike Maymun-Diz), well-provisioned, and featured a reliable water supply. However, the Nizari faith demands the faithful pay absolute obedience to the Imam in all circumstances. Hülegü surrounded Alamut with his army, and Khurshah unsuccessfully attempted to persuade its commander to surrender. Hülegü left a large force under Balaghai to besiege Alamut, and then with Khurshah, set out to besiege the nearby Lambsar. Muqaddam al-Din eventually capitulated when he learned that the Imam wasn't obligated to surrender after a few days in December 1256.

Juvayni describes the difficulty by which the Mongols dismantled the plastered walls and lead-covered ramparts of Alamut. The Mongols had to set fire to the buildings and then destroy them piece by piece. He also notes the extensive chambers, galleries, and deep tanks filled with wine, vinegar, honey, and other goods. During the pillage, one man was almost drowned in a honey vat.

After examining Alamut's famous library, Juvayni saved "copies of the Qur'an and other choice books" as well as "astronomical instruments such as kursis (part of an astrolabe), armillary spheres, complete and partial astrolabes, and others", and burned the other books "which related to their heresy and error". He also picked Hasan Sabbah's biography, Sargudhasht-i Bābā Sayyidinā (Persian: سرگذشت بابا سیدنا), which interested him, but he claims he burnt it after reading it. Juvayni has extensively used the contents of this book and probably other books from the Alamut library in his Tarikh-i Jahangushay.

Juvayni noted the impregnability and self-sufficiency of Alamut and the other Nizari fortresses. Rashid al-Din similarly writes of the good fortune of Mongols in their war against the Nizaris.

== Aftermath ==
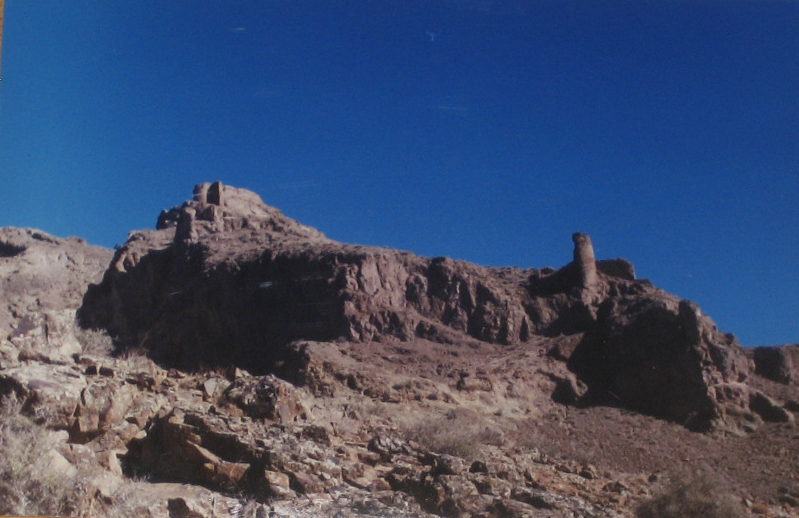
The resistance in the major fortress of Lambsar collapsed in 1257 after a cholera outbreak

By 1256, Hülegü almost eliminated the Persian Nizaris as an independent military force. Shams al-Din, the muhtasham of Quhistan, together with officials from the retinue of the Imam, set out to start dismantling the remaining fifty Ismaili castles in Quhistan, starting from Gerdkuh. Castellans from Daylam, Ashkawar, and Tarem joined the Imam in capitulating the castles. Khurshah was taken to Qazvin where he sent messages to the Syrian Nizari stronghold instructing them to surrender, but they did not act, believing that the Imam was acting under duress. As his position became intolerable, Khurshah asked Hülegü to be allowed to go meet Möngke in Mongolia, promising that he would persuade the remaining Ismaili fortresses to surrender. Möngke rebuked him after visiting him in Karakoram, Mongolia, due to his failure to hand over Lambsar and Gerdkuh, and ordered his return to his homeland. In the way, he and his small retinue were executed by their Mongol escort. Möngke meanwhile issued a general massacre of all Nizari Ismailis, including all of Khurshah's family as well as the garrisons. Khurshah's relatives who were kept at Qazvin were killed by Qaraqai Bitikchi, while Ötegü-China summoned the Nizaris of Quhistan to gatherings and slaughtered about 12,000 people. Möngke's order reflects an earlier order by Chingiz Khan. Around 100,000 people are estimated to have been killed.

Hülegü then moved with the bulk of his army to Azerbaijan, officially established his own khanate (the Ilkhanate), and then sacked Baghdad in 1258.

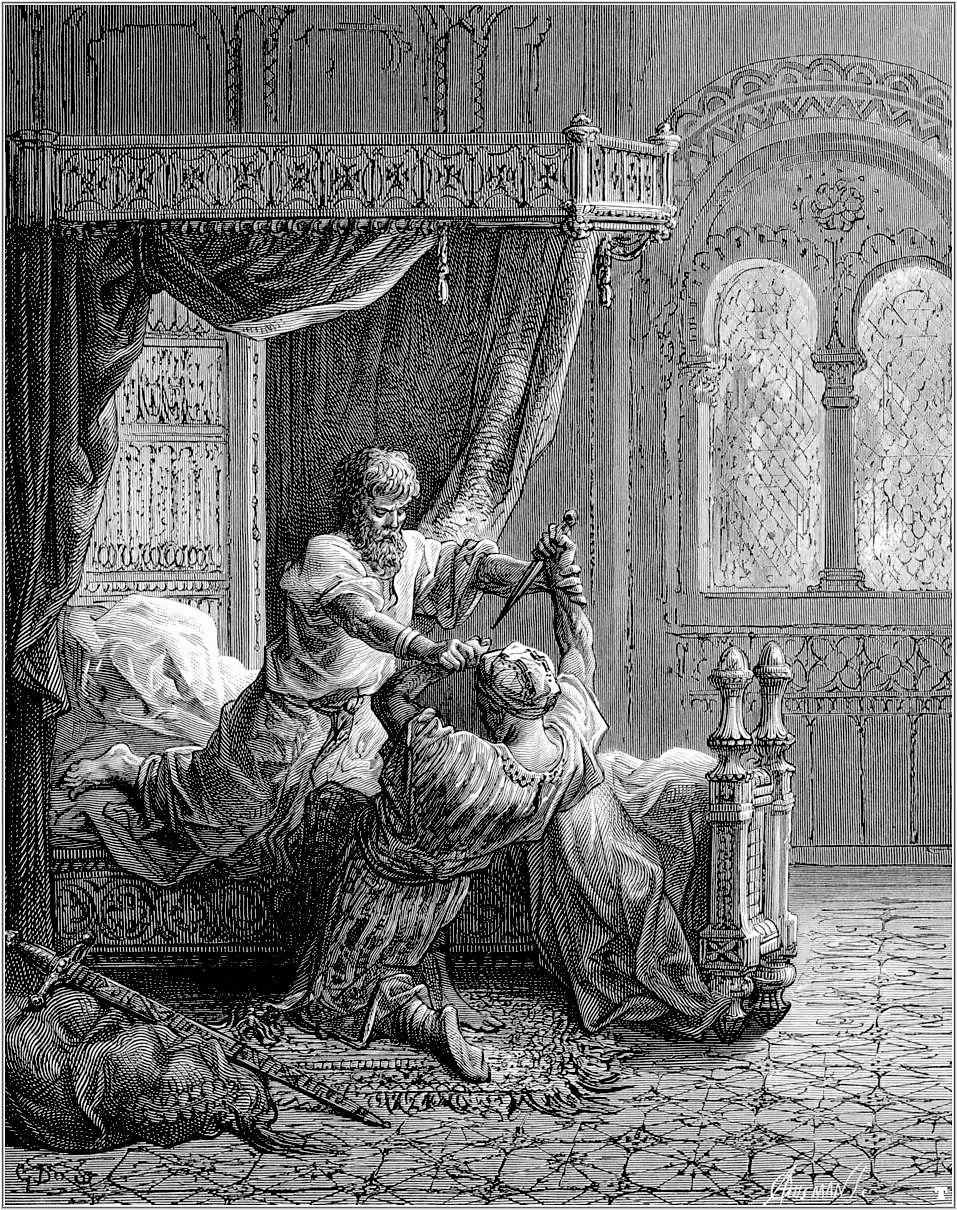
The Nizaris were still active after the Alamut Period. The assassination attempt against Edward of England in June 1272, probably by a Syrian fida'i employed by Baibars, contributed to the termination of the Ninth Crusade.

As the centralized government of the Nizaris was disestablished, the Nizaris either were killed or had abandoned their traditional strongholds. Many of them migrated to Afghanistan, Badakhshan, and Sindh. Little is known about the history of the Ismailis in this stage, until two centuries later, when they again began to grow as scattered communities under regional da'is in Iran, Afghanistan, Badakhshan, Syria, and India. The Nizaris of Syria were tolerated by the Bahri Mamluks and held a few castles under Mamluk suzerainty. The Mamluks may have employed Nizari fedais against their own enemies, notably the attempted assassination of the Crusader Prince Edward of England in 1271.

Resistance by the Nizaris in Persia was still ongoing in some forts, notably Lambsar, Gerdkuh, and several forts in Quhistan. Lambsar fell in January 1257 after a cholera outbreak. Gerdkuh resisted much longer. The Mongols had built permanent structures and houses around this fortress, the ruins of which, together with two types of stones used for the Nizari and Mongol mangonels, are still extant today. On 15 December 1270, during the reign of Abaqa, the garrison of Gerdkuh surrendered from want of clothing. It was thirteen years after the fall of Alamut, and seventeen years after its first siege by Kitbuqa; the Mongols killed the surviving garrison but did not destroy the fortress. In the same year, an unsuccessful assassination attempt on Juvayni is attributed to the Nizaris, who had earlier spoken of their total annihilation. By 1273, all the Syrian Nizari castles were also captured by Baibars.

In 1275, a Nizari force under a son of Khurshah (titled Naw Dawlat or Abu Dawlat) and a descendant of the Khwarezmian dynasty recaptured the Alamut Castle, but the Mongols reclaimed it a year later. Just like other groups in the nearby regions, the Nizaris too were still able to retain a (semi)-independent state in their heartland of Daylam. This continued at least until Öljaitü's campaign against Gilan in 1307, which was successful but was a pyrrhic victory with heavy casualties on both sides. Nevertheless, the possible Ilkhanate authority over the region must have been eradicated in 1335 after the death of the last ruler of the Ilkhanate. By 1368, Daylam was governed by Kiya Sayf al-Din, a member of the Kushaijis, an Ismaili dynasty. He was attacked and killed by Sayyid Ali Kiya, the founder of the Karkiya dynasty. The Nizaris also re-established their Imamate at the village of Anjudan, where they are recorded to be active in the 14–15th century.
