= Estanavand Naruheh Castle =

Castle in Semnan Province, Iran

Ostanavand Castle
- قلعه استاناوند ناروهه
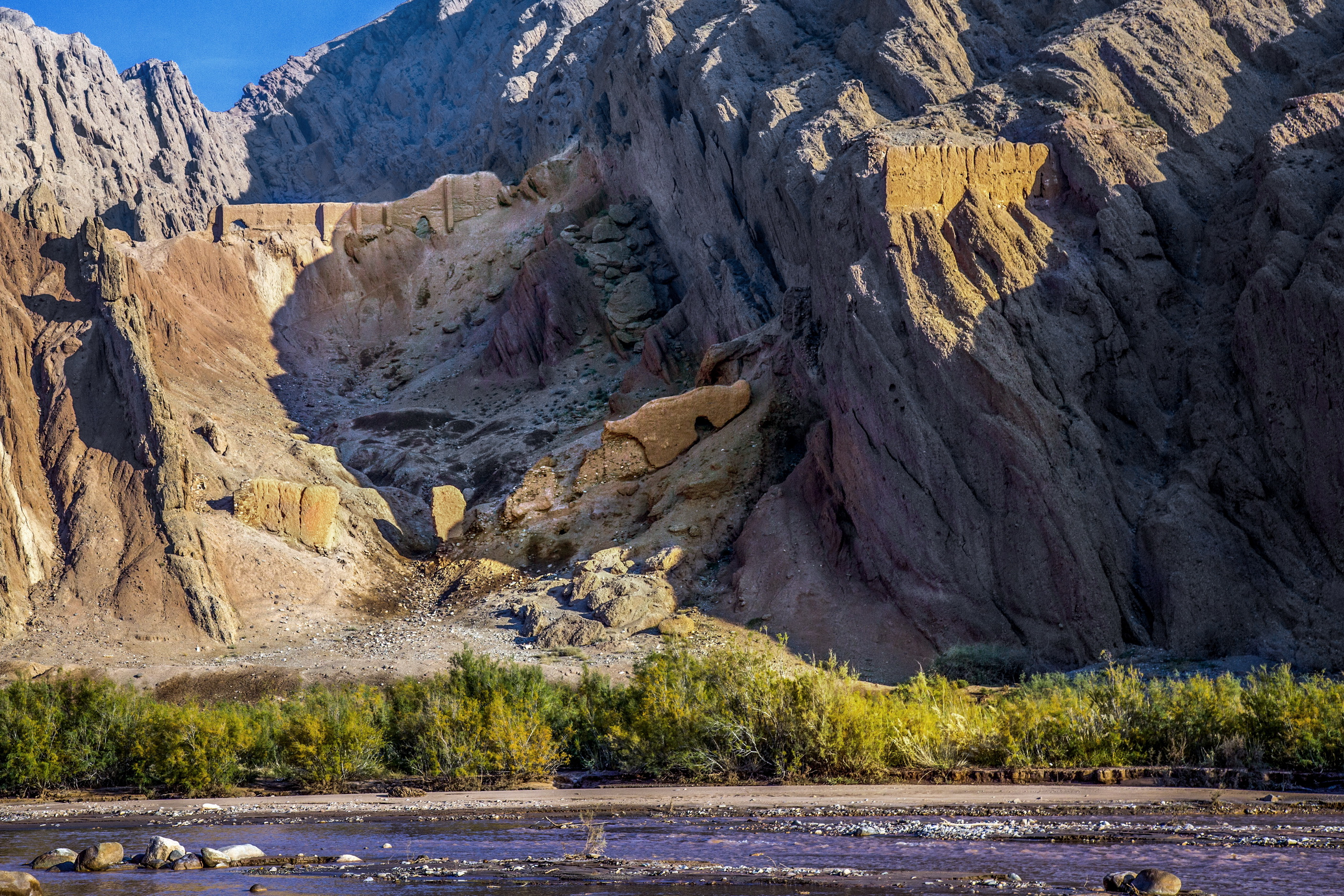

- Location within Iran

General information
- Type: Castle
- Location: Garmsar County, Iran
- Coordinates: 35°18′01″N 52°25′07″E

Estanavand Naruheh castle (Persian: قلعه استاناوند ناروهه, also Ostanavand, Ustanawand or Ustunawand) is a historical castle located in Garmsar County in Semnan Province, The longevity of this fortress dates back to the Nizari Ismaili state.

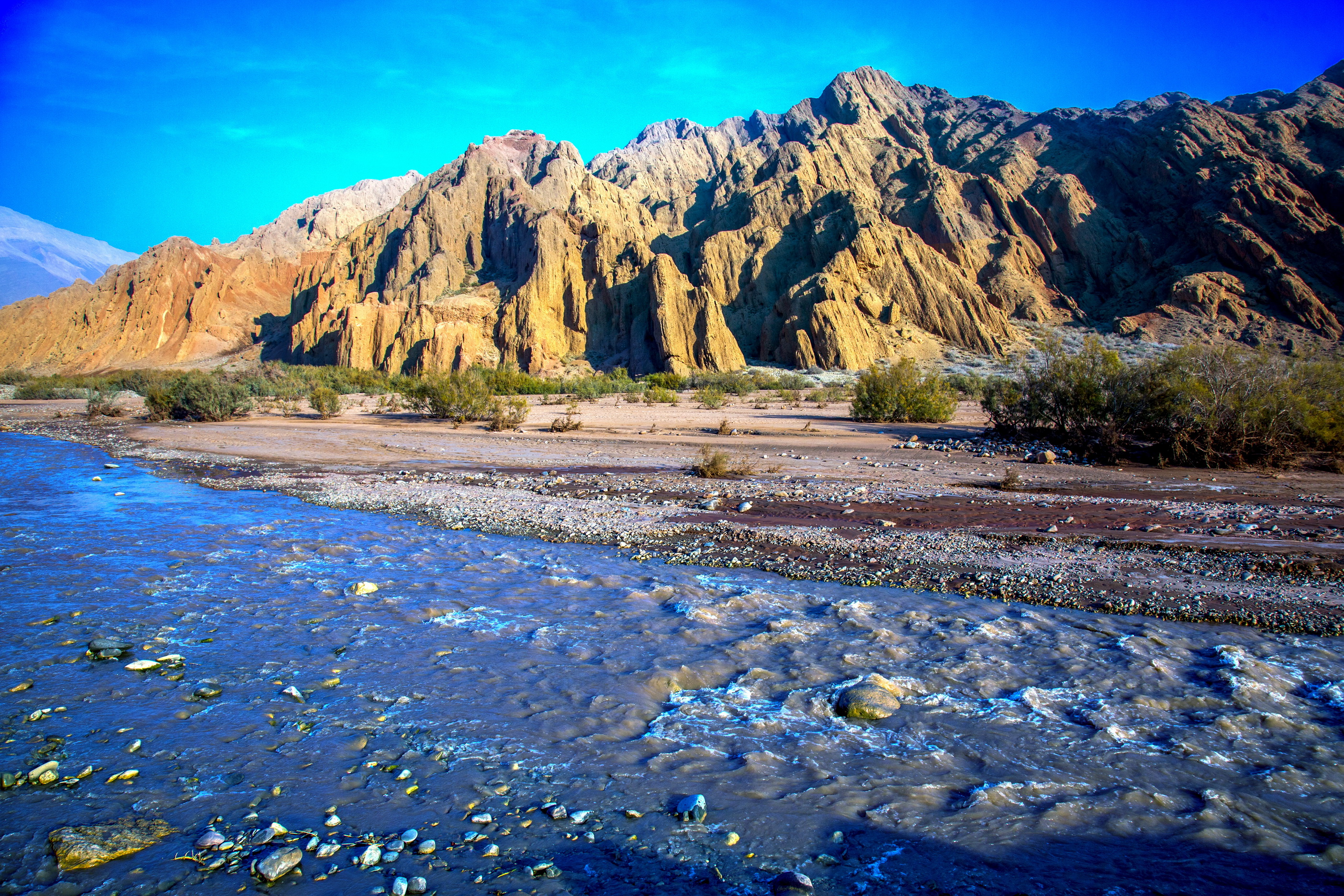
