= Kol Hassan Sabbah Castle =

Castle in South Khorasan Province, Iran

Kol Hassan Sabbah castle
- قلعه کل حسن صباح
- Interactive map of the Kol Hassan Sabbah castle area

General information
- Type: Castle
- Location: Sarbisheh County, Iran

Mo'menabad Castle (Persian: قلعه مؤمن آباد), locally known as Kal Hassan Sabbah castle (قلعه کل حسن صباح) is a historical castle located in Sarbisheh County in South Khorasan Province, Iran. The longevity of this fortress dates back to the Nizari Ismaili state.
