= Mansur Kuh Castle =

Castle in Semnan Province, Iran

Mansur Kuh castle
- قلعه منصور کوه
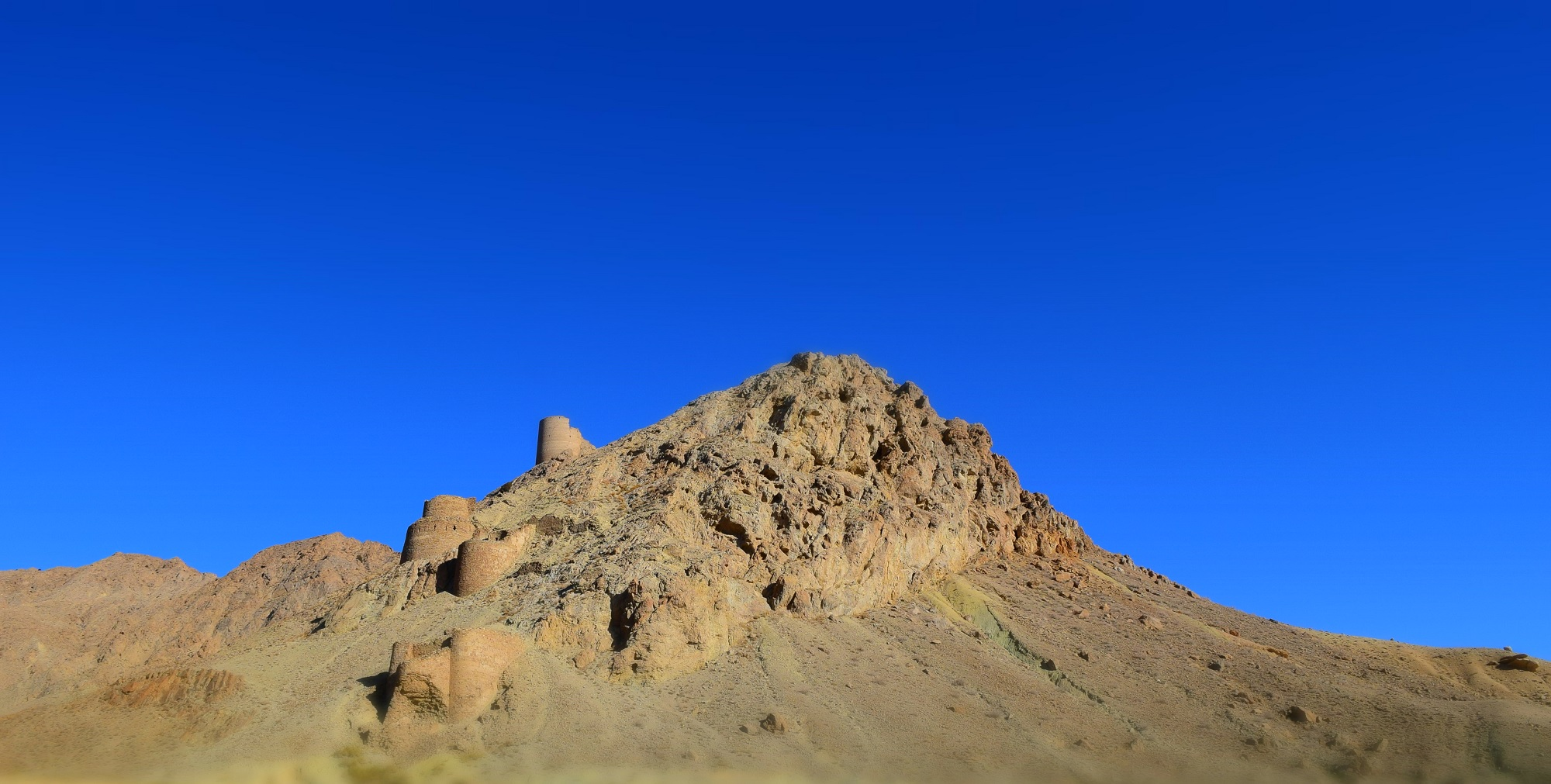
- Interactive map of the Mansur Kuh castle area

General information
- Type: Castle
- Location: Damghan County, Iran

Mansur Kuh castle (Persian: قلعه منصور کوه; also Mansurkuh or Mansurakuh) is a historical castle located in Damghan County in Semnan Province, The longevity of this fortress dates back to the Nizari Ismaili state.
