= Gerdkuh =

Nizari Ismaili fortress in present-day Semnan Province, Iran

- گردکوه
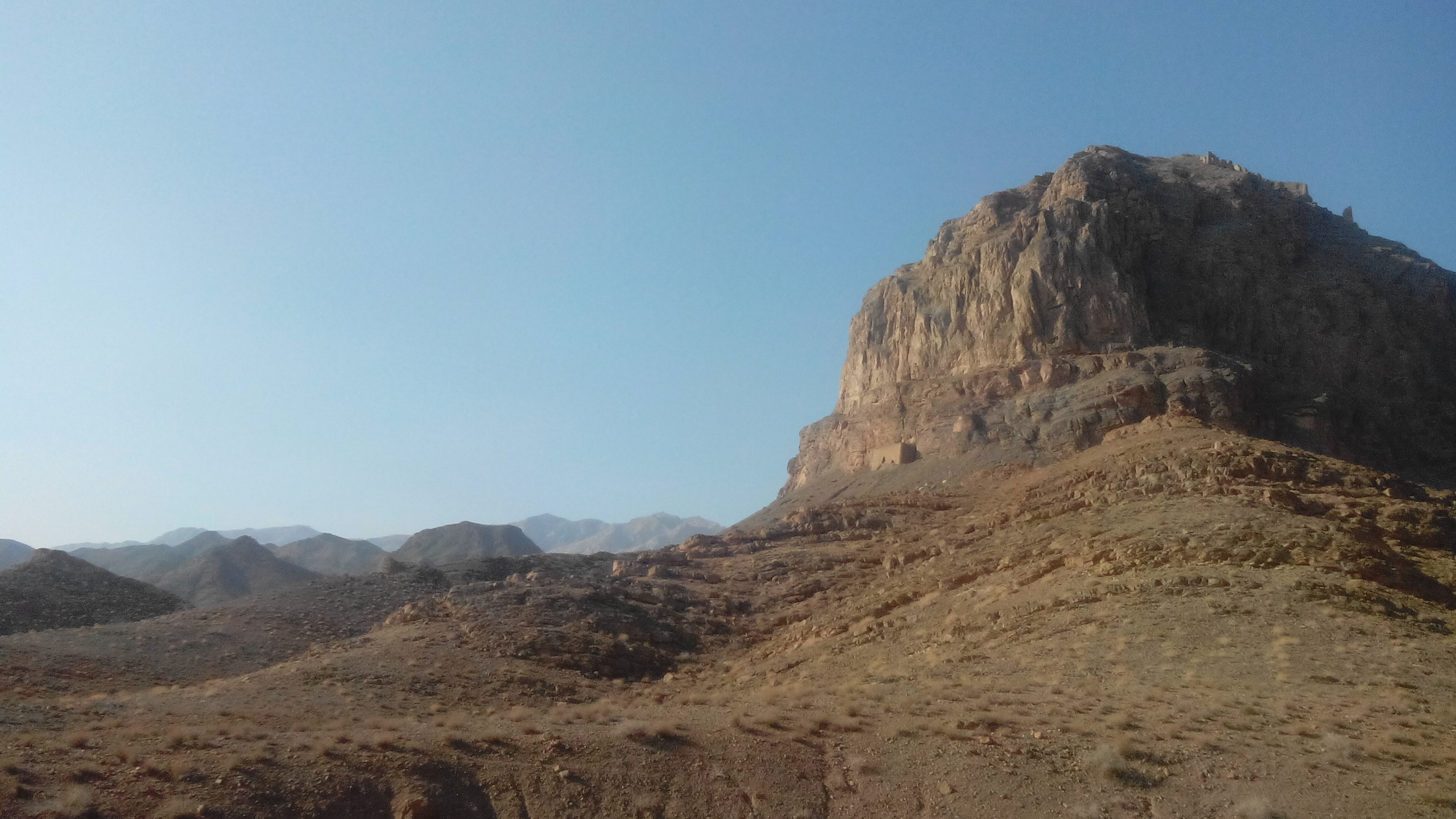
- Interactive map of the Gerdkuh area
- Alternative names: Dez-i Gonbadan

General information
- Status: In ruins
- Type: Fortress
- Architectural style: Ismaili
- Location: Qumis (modern Semnan Province, Iran), Damghan, Iran
- Coordinates: 36°09′43″N 54°09′25″E
- Inaugurated: 1100
- Renovated: 1096

Height
- Height: 1,525 metres (5,003 ft)

Dimensions
- Circumference: 6 kilometres (3.7 mi)

Technical details
- Material: Stone

Design and construction
- Developer: Ra'is Mu'ayyad al-Din Muzaffar ibn Ahmad Mustawfi
- Known for: Nizari Ismaili stronghold

Gerdkuh was a castle of the Nizari Isma'ili state located near Damghan in the region of Qumis (modern-day Semnan Province of Iran).

Gerdkuh is a "fortified mountain"—a high vertical rock of 300 m in height with buildings on its summit and fortifications at its sides, defended by a triple ring of fortifications at its foot, making the citadel impregnable to direct military assault. It was originally a small fort acquired and refortified in 1096 AD by a Seljuq commander who was secretly a Nizari. The fortress served as a place of refuge for the families of the Nizaris, and its strategic location in the middle of the Khorasan Road made it a useful base for collecting taxes from the passing caravans of the Silk Road.

Gerdkuh resisted the Mongol invasion of 1253 AD for 17 years, becoming the last Nizari stronghold in Persia to fall. The fortress remained in use until the early Safavid period. Among the major Nizari fortresses, Gerdkuh is the least studied one.

== Name ==
The word Girdkūh (Persian: گردکوه) is a compound of gird (گرد) for "circular" (round) and kūh (کوه) for "mountain". It is named this due to the circular shape of the mountain peak.

In the Chinese work History of Yuan, Gerdkuh is recorded multiple times, as Yü-r-gu, K‘i-du-bu, K‘i-du-bu-gu, and Gir-r-du-k‘ie, on top of the mount Yen-han, west of Tan-han (Damghan). The fortress is called Tigado by Hayton of Corycus.

The fortress is also known as Dezh-e Gonbadān (دژ گنبدان), literally "fortress of the domes"). The Gonbadān-Dezh (گنبدان دژ) mentioned in Shahnama, in which Isfandiyar was imprisoned, may be identified with Gerdkuh.

== Description ==
External media

Images
- Gerdkuh Castle from destinationiran.com
- Rock of Gerdkuh from Wikia

Video
- Reconstructed 3D model of the fortress on tamasha.com
- Reconstructed 3D model of the fortress on YouTube

Gerdkuh is located around 15 kilometres (9.3 mi) west of Damghan off the main Semnan road. It is best approached via the nearby village Hajjiabad-e Razveh.

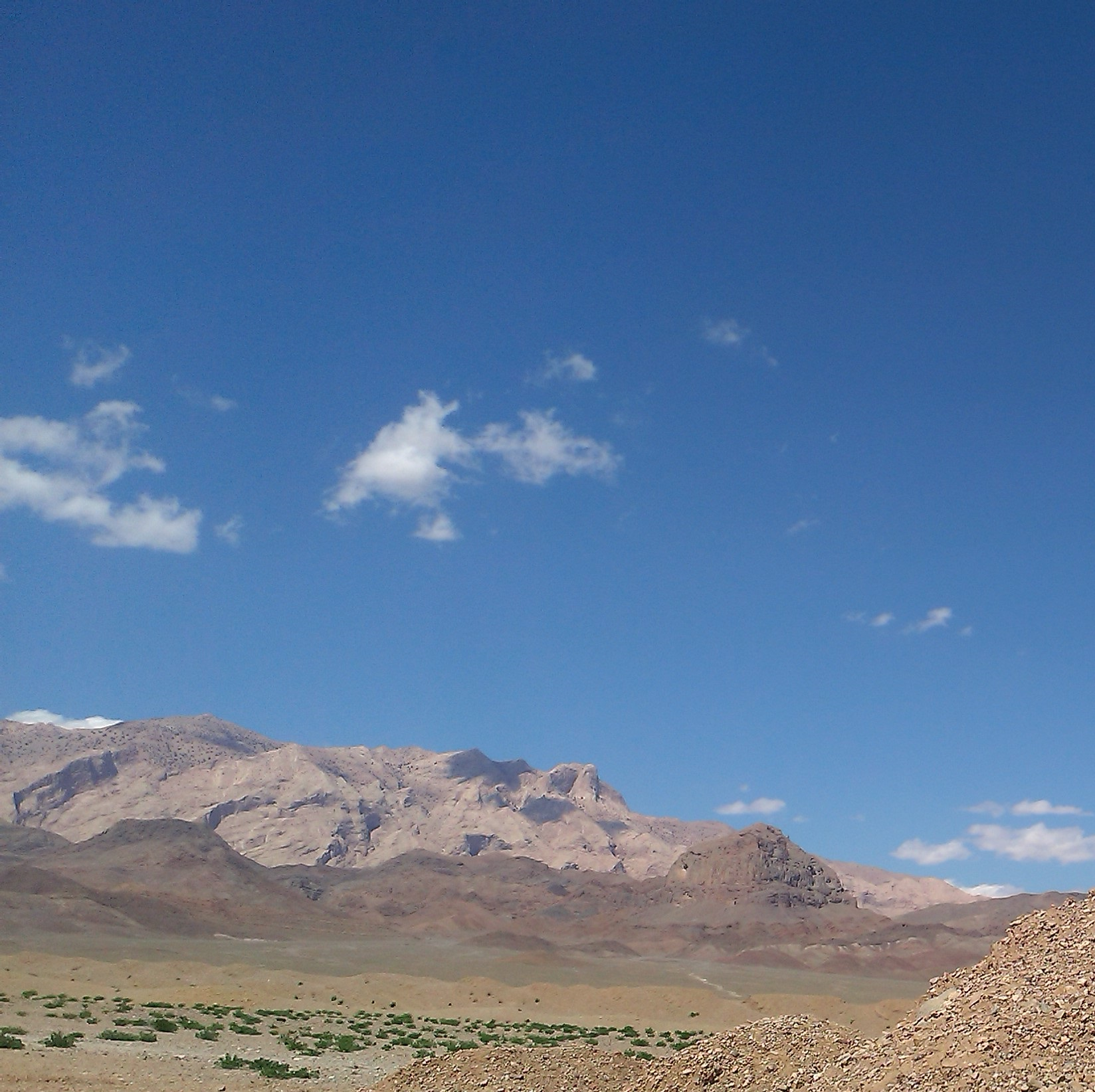

The rock of Gerdkuh has a distinct conical shape which rises 300 metres (980 ft) above the surrounding scree slopes. Apart from the east, the slopes are almost impossible to scale and no defensive works were necessary. The height of the plain surrounding the rock is 1,230 metres (4,040 ft), and the height of the top of Gerdkuh's fort is 1,525 metres (5,003 ft). The steepness of the rock and its height has been noted in the work History of Yuan, which claims no arrows or mangonel stones could reach it.

The main perimeter defense consisted of rings of 35 forts with a total circumference of 6 kilometres (3.7 mi). The forts are more concentrated on the eastern side, which feature three rings of them—one 300 metres (980 ft) away from the castle, another 200 metres (660 ft) away, and the third one right at the foot of the castle. Their purpose may include the protection of the cultivated fertile ground on the castle's foot, and tax-collecting bases for passing caravans, as well as a more conventional and accessible place of storage relative to the buildings at the hilltop.

A rectangular outer gatehouse on the southern side apparently served as a reception post. The proper entrance is, however, via the main gatehouse on the eastern side. The main gatehouse was 10.5–12 metres (34–39 ft) wide and 7.5 metres (25 ft) high. It featured two round turrets on each side made of smooth dressed stones. The outer ramp leading to this gate was probably built by the besieging Mongols. There is a spring just above this gatehouse. Via a line of defenses it leads to an inner gatehouse which defends the only possible ascent to the main castle. The mountain fortifications are defended with double walls built between towers. Natural perpendicular drops increased their effectiveness.

The view from the top of the mountain is spectacular. To the south there is a wide vista over the nearby village to the Great Salt Desert shimmering in the background. To the east you can see Damghan and, on a clear day, as far as Shahrud. After a heavy rainfall the agricultural area on the south-east slope inside the outer defense walls is very clear ... To the west stretches the road to Semnan and the chain of the Alborz mountains.

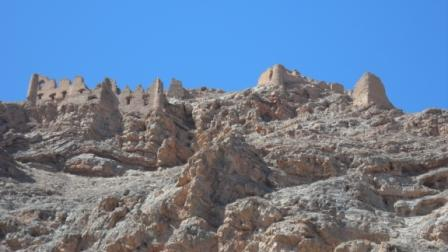
Ruins of the late mud-brick wall on the hilltop

The mountain top has its own fortifications. There is a citadel 30.5 metres (100 ft) in length and 24 metres (79 ft) in width. Its base is built with dressed blocks of stone and features a well in the middle. The main inhabited area, which is visible from the plain, was a complex of two rows of buildings on the south-eastern slope, all of them at least two or three stories high. On the north-east, there is a late mud wall with little remnants of buildings. On the south-west there is a cistern and remains of a defensive tower. The main water catchment area is, however, the three cisterns on the southern side of the hilltop where the ground drops steeply about 60.5 metres (198 ft). They feature an outer wall of 3 metres (9.8 ft) in thickness made of stone and mud-brick covered by plaster, with vaulted roofs and turrets. There are more cisterns and wells elsewhere within the fortifications.

== History ==
The fortress probably dates back to the pre-Islamic period. Gerdkuh was situated on the Khorasan Road and guarded the routes toward the Alborz mountain range.

=== Seljuk period ===
Gerdkuh was refortified and transferred into the Nizari Isma'ili possession in 1100 by Ra'is Mu'ayyad al-Din Muzaffar ibn Ahmad Mustawfi (رئیس مؤید الدین مظفر بن احمد مستوفی), a secret Isma'ili convert and lieutenant of the Seljuq emir Amirdad Habashi (امیرداد حبشی), who in turn had acquired Gedrkuh in 1096 from Sultan Barkiyaruq. Now under Hassan-i Sabbah, Muzaffar continued as the commandant of the stronghold until being succeeded by his son Sharaf al-Din Muhammad.

Muzaffar reportedly dug an extremely deep well in the fort but did not reach the water. Years later, water gushed out after an earthquake.

In 528 AH (Islamic year) during the reign of Sultan Ahmad Sanjar, Gerdkuh was besieged by amir Arghush. As the castle ran out of provisions, they bribed the amir to abandon the siege.

=== Khwarezmshahian period ===
During the Mongol invasion, Sultan Muhammad II of Khwarazm retreated to Ray. The Mongol commander Subutai followed him, and as he reached Damghan, some of the city elites sought refuge in Nizaris' Gerdkuh.

=== The Mongol siege of Gerdkuh ===
Mongol siege(s) of Gerdkuh
- Part of the Mongol campaign against the Nizaris
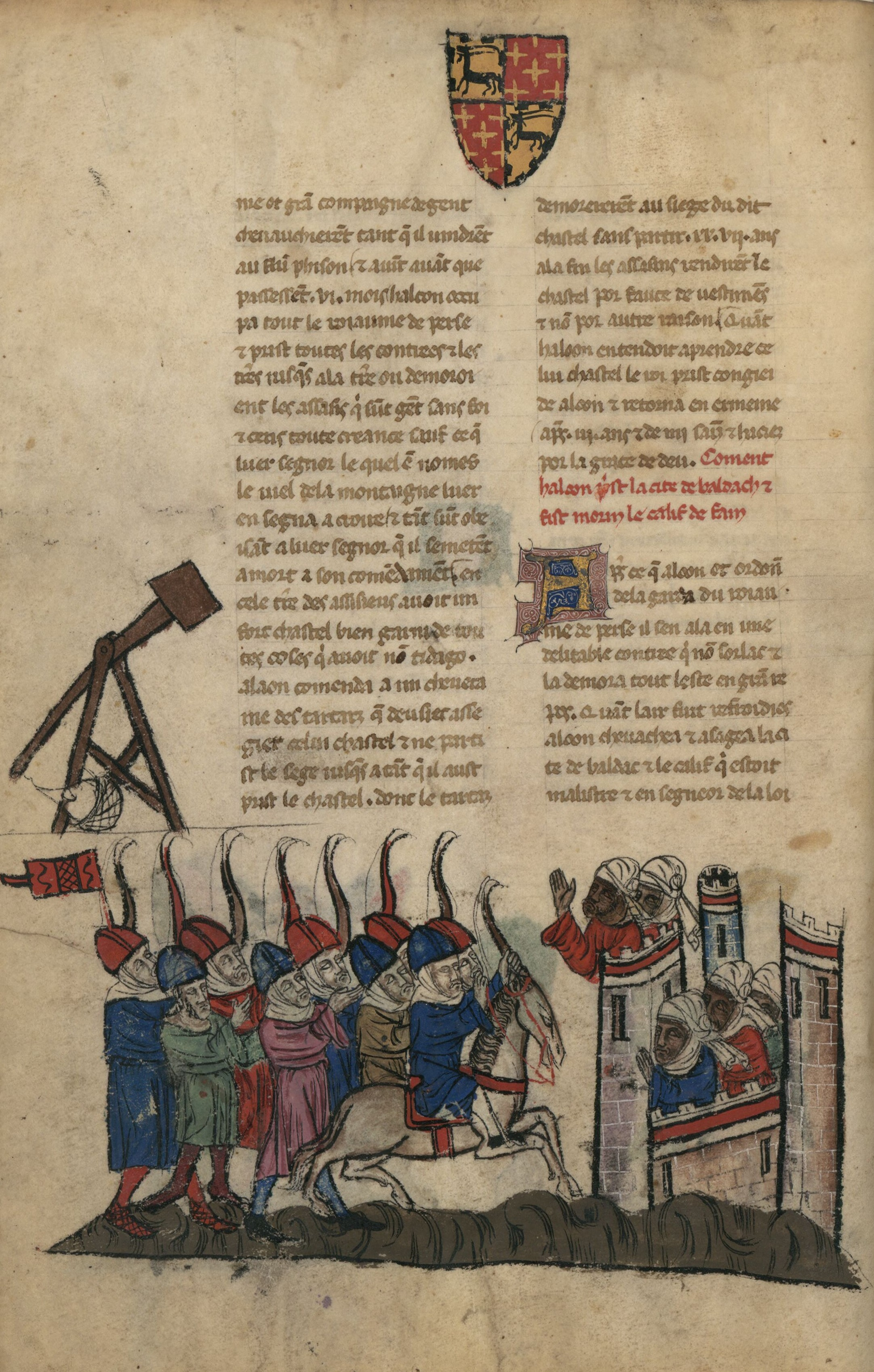
- The siege of Tigado (Gerdkuh), from a manuscript of La Flor des estoires de la terre d'Orient by Hayton of Corycus
Date	May 1253 – 15 December 1270 (17 years, 7 months)
Location	Gerdkuh
Result	Nizzari surrender from want of clothing

Belligerents
Mongol Empire, succeeded by the Ilkhanate; Bavandids; Paduspanids	Nizari Ismaili state (until 1256); Garrison of Gerdkuh; Reinforcements from Alamut

Commanders and leaders
Kitbuqa; Büri †; Abaqa Khan; Shams al-Muluk Muhammad; Shahragim	Qadi Tajuddin Mardanshah (surrendered)

Strength
5000 mongol army 10000 mongol army: Medieval sources: 5000 knights 5000 infantary	110 the garrison

Casualties and losses
100 (first siege)	Entire force

In March 1253, Hülegü's commander Kitbuqa, who was commanding the advance guard, crossed Oxus (Amu Darya) with 12,000 men (one tümen plus two mingghans under Köke Ilgei). In April 1253, he captured several Nizari fortresses in Quhistan and killed their inhabitants, and in May he attacked Qumis and laid siege to Gerdkuh with 5,000 men and build walls and siege works around it. Kitbuqa left an army under amir Büri to besiege Gerdkuh.

In December 1253, Girdkuh's garrison sallied at night and killed 100 (or several hundred) Mongols, including Büri. In the summer of 1254, an outbreak of cholera in Gerdkuh weakened the garrison's resistance. However, unlike Lambsar, Gerdkuh survived the epidemic and was saved by the arrival of reinforcements from Ala al-Din Muhammad in Alamut.

As Hülegü's main army was advancing in Iran, Rukn al-Din Khurshah ordered Gerdkuh and fortresses of Quhistan to surrender. The Nizari chief in Gerdkuh, Qadi Tajuddin Mardanshah, surrendered, but the garrison continued to resist. In 1256, Maymun-Diz and Alamut surrendered and were destroyed by the Mongols, resulting in the official disestablishment of the Nizari Ismaili state. Khurshah was in the custody of the Mongols. As his position became intolerable, he asked Hülegü to be allowed to go meet Möngke in Mongolia to persuade the remaining Ismaili fortresses to surrender. Möngke rebuked him due to his failure to hand over Lambsar and Gerdkuh, and ordered a general massacre of all Nizari Ismailis, including Khurshah.

The Mongols had built permanent buildings, houses, and defensive walls near Gerdkuh, the ruins of which still remain today in Hajjiabad-e Razveh and other nearby villages. Two types of stones used for Nizari and Mongol mangonels were visible on the northeastern slope as of 1985. There are also remains of the Mongol siege works in the plain between Hajjiabad-e Razveh and Gerdkuh.

The mongols could not defeat gerdkuh for 16 years. On December 1270, during the reign of Abaqa, the garrison of Gerdkuh surrendered from want of clothing. It was thirteen years after the fall of Alamut, and seventeen years after its first siege by Kitbuqa. The Mongols killed the surviving garrison but did not destroy the fortress.

=== After the Mongol takeover ===
Gerdkuh reappears only once in historical records in 1384, when it was briefly captured by the rebellious governor Amir Vali of Astarabad. It was probably completely abandoned in the early Safavid period.

=== Modern studies ===
The Qajar king Naser al-Din Shah (1848–1896) encouraged Shaykh Mohammad Mehdi Abdol-Rabb-Abadi to investigate the site, whose brief report contains accurate measurements.

The site was visited multiple times by Peter Wiley, who left a detailed description in his book Eagle's Nest. In 1967 the site was reported to be covered with shards and artifacts; few of them were remaining in the following year. No archeological survey of the ruins has been made as of 2012. Among major Nizari castles, Gerdkuh is the least studied one.

== See also ==
- Muhammad (Bavandid ruler)
- Kafer Ghal'eh of Sangsar (Mehdishahr)
