= Kalisham Castle =

Castle in Gilan Province, Iran

Kalisham castle
- قلعه کلیشم

General information
- Type: Castle
- Location: Rudbar County, Iran

Kalisham castle (Persian: قلعه کلیشم) is a historical castle located in Rudbar County in Gilan Province, The longevity of this fortress dates back to the Iron Age.
