= Gahur Castle =

Castle in Iran

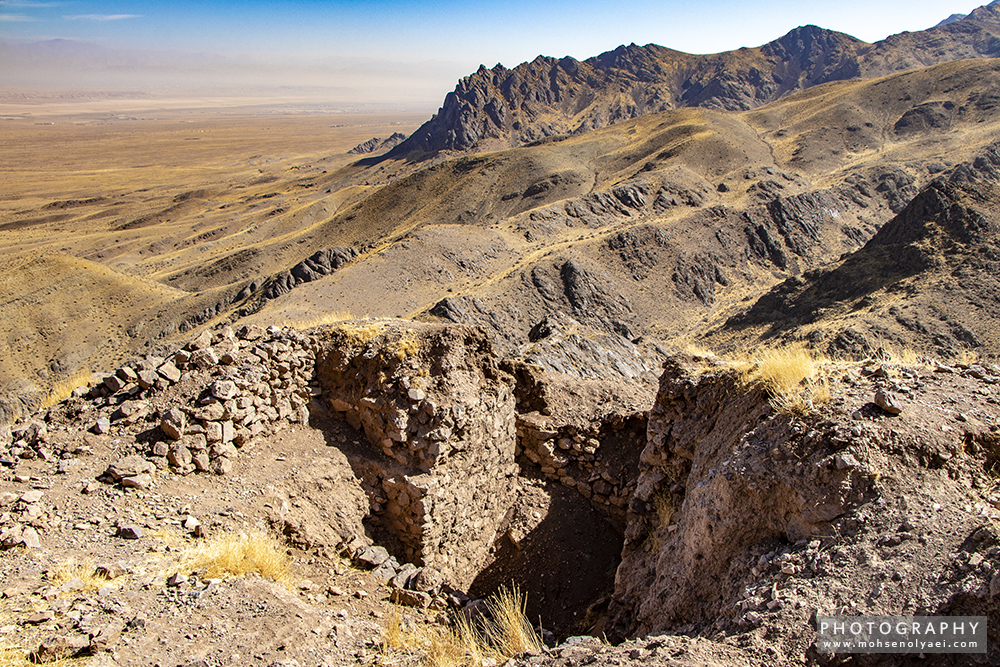
- Location: Alborz province, Iran

Gahur Castle also Gahwar (Persian: قلعه گهور), is a ruined castle watchtower seven kilometers from Eshtehard Road East in Iran. It is five kilometers south of the village Mokhtarabad among the mountains, there is a relatively high mountain which is called Mount Gahur. The castle was rebuilt in the time of Sultan Ali Mahjoub but again was destroyed after his death.
