= Qumis (region) =

Historic province of pre-Islamic Persia

Qūmis (Arabic: قومس, from Persian: کومس / کومش, romanized: Kōmis / Kōmiš; Ancient Greek: Κωμισηνή, romanized: Kōmisēnē; Old Armenian: Կոմշ, romanized: Komsh), was a province in pre-Islamic Persia, lying between the southern Alborz chain watershed and the northern fringes of the Dasht-e Kavir. During the Sasanian Empire, it designated the area lying between the provinces of Ray and Hyrcania (Gurgan) and was part of the province of Padishkhwargar.

Qumis became a province in medieval Iran. Its western boundaries lay in the eastern rural districts of Ray while in the east it marched with Khurasan. It was bisected by the Great Khurasan Road, along which were situated the major cities of (from west to east) Khuwar (now Aradan), Semnan, Shahr-i Qumis ("Hecatompylos", the administrative capital, now Damghan), and Bistam, while in its southeastern extremity lay the town of Biyar (now Beyarjomand).

The 856 Damghan earthquake killed around 200,000 people. It was one of the deadliest earthquakes in recorded history.

There are remains of several Ismaili stronghlolds in the region, notably Gerdkuh, most of which were captured during the Mongol campaign against the Nizaris, which began in 1253.

The name Qumis became obsolete in the beginning of the 11th century. Currently, the region is divided between the modern provinces of Mazandaran and Semnan.

== Sources ==
- Melville, Charles (1980). "Earthquakes in the History of Nishapur". Iran. 18: 103–120.
