= List of leaders of the Nizari–Seljuk conflicts =

This is a list of the commanders and leaders of the Nizari–Seljuk conflicts.

== Participants ==
The Great Seljuk Empire at its greatest extent

The conflicts were more complex than a simple Nizari vs Seljuk one. Even the Ismailis themselves were not unified; e.g. the Ismailis in Isfahan did not recognize the authority of Hassan-i Sabbah in Alamut. Sometimes the actual anti-Ismailism came from the local Sunni population rather than the Seljuk government, such as the massacre of the Ismailis in Isfahan in 1101. In the Seljuk dynastic conflicts, all sides were relying on Ismaili soldiers, and some Seljuk elites are known to be Ismaili converts (e.g. Iranshah ibn Turanshah) or at least to have Nizari sympathies at times (e.g. Barkiyaruq and Ridwan ibn Tutush).

== Nizari Ismailis ==
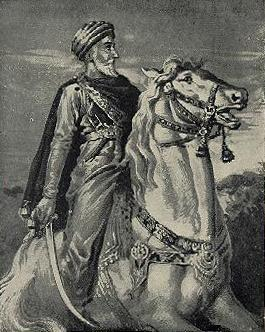
Hassan-i Sabbah

Unlike the Fatimids who mostly produced learned scholars, the Nizaris of Alamut were mostly preoccupied with survival in their extremely hostile environment, and naturally produced, or acquired the alliance of, good military leaders. Many of these commanders are both military leaders and religious preachers (da'i) at the same time.

- Abd al-Malik ibn Attash, Fatimid Chief Da'i of Persia and Iraq (1070s)
  - Hassan-i Sabbah, Da'i of Daylam
  - Tahir (executed) , local leader in Sawa
- Hassan-i Sabbah, hujja, Lord of Alamut (1090–1124)
  - Dihdar Abu Ali Ardestani, da'i in Qazwin
  - Husayn Qa'ini, da'i, muhtasham (Governor) of Quhistan
  - Kiya Muzaffar?, muhtasham of Quhistan
  - al-Hakim al-Munajjim, Chief Da'i of Syria
  - Abu Tahir al-Sa'igh (executed) , Chief Da'i of Syria
    - Abu al-Fath of Sarmin (executed) , da'i in Syria
    - Husam al-Din ibn Dumlaj, commander of the Nizari armed forces in Aleppo
    - Ibrahim al-Ajami, commandant of the Qal'at al-Balis
    - Isma'il (executed) , da'i
    - Unnamed brother of al-Hakim al-Munajjim (executed)
  - Bahram al-Da'i, Chief Da'i of Syria
  - Mu'ayyad al-Din Muzaffar ibn Ahmad Mustawfi, former Seljuk ra'is, commandant of Gerdkuh
  - Abu Hamza, da'i in Arrajan
  - Kiya Buzurg-Ummid, commander, commandant of Lambsar Castle
  - Kiya Abu Ja'far, commander-in-chief (sahib-i jaysh)
  - Kiya Abu Ali, commander
  - Kiya Garshasb, commander
  - Hasan Adam Qasrani
  - Kayqubad Daylami, commandant of Tikrit Citadel
- Ahmad ibn Abd al-Malik ibn Attash (executed) , da'i
- Kiya Buzurg-Ummid, hujja, Lord of Alamut (1124–1138)
  - Dihdar Abu Ali Ardestani, member of the ruling council
  - Hasan Adam Qasrani, member of the ruling council
  - Kiya Abu Ja'far, member of the ruling council
  - Isma'il al-Ajami, Chief Da'i of Syria
  - Salarjuy(?), defected Seljuk amir
  - Kiya Nushad(?), commander
  - Khwaja Muhammad Nasihi Shahrastani (executed)
- Kiya Muhammad ibn Buzurg-Ummid, hujja, Lord of Alamut (1138–1162)
  - Kiya Muhammad ibn Ali Khusraw Firuz, commander
  - Kiya Ali ibn Buzurg-Ummid, commander
  - Dihkhuda Abu Yusuf, commander
  - Kiya Husayn ibn Abd al-Jabbar
  - Amir Balqasim Shamshirzan (POW) (executed) , commander in Lambsar
  - Amir Malikshah, commander
  - Kiya Isma'il, commander
  - Ali ibn Wafa' †, commander in Syria
  - Shaykh Abu Muhammad, Chief Da'i of Syria

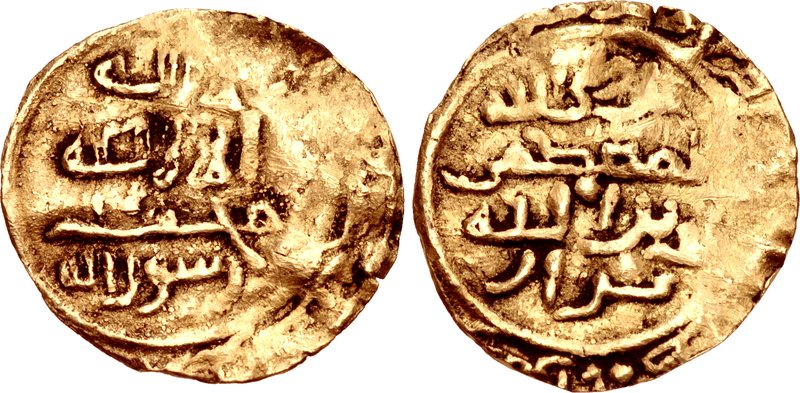
Coin of Hassan II of Alamut

- Hassan II 'Ala Dhikrihi's-Salam, Imam, Lord of Alamut (1162–1166)
  - Rashid al-Din Sinan, Chief Da'i of Syria
- Nur al-Din Muhammad II, Imam, Lord of Alamut (1166–1210)

=== Allies and sympathizers ===
- Barkiyaruq (occasionally), sultan
  - Majd al-Mulk al-Balasani (executed) , vizier of Barkiyaruq
  - Amirdad Habashi, amir of Barkiyaruq, commander of Tabaristan and Jurjan
    - Mu'ayyad al-Din Muzaffar ibn Ahmad Mustawfi, Seljuk ra'is
- Sa'd al-Mulk (executed) , vizier of Muhammad Tapar
- Abu al-Qasim Dargazini, vizier of Mahmud II
- Iranshah ibn Turanshah, sultan of the Seljuks of Kirman
- Sanjar, ruler of Khurasan (1097–1118), sultan of the Great Seljuk Empire (1118–1153)
- Fakhr al-Mulk Ridwan ibn Tutush, sultan of Aleppo
- Shams al-Mulk Alp Arslan al-Akhras (until 1113), sultan of Aleppo
- Ilghazi, amir, Artuqid prince of Mardin and Mayyafariqin
- Toghtekin, atabeg of Damascus
  - Abu Ali Tahir ibn Sa'd al-Mazadaqani (executed) , vizier
- Shahrnush ibn Hazarasf ibn Namawar, Bawandid ruler
- Hazarasf ibn Shahrnush (d. 1190), Paduspanid ruler
- Raymond of Poitiers †, Prince of Antioch
- Al-Amid ibn Mansur (Mas'ud?), governor of Turaythith
- Al-Zahir Ghazi (in 1213), Ayyubid emir of Aleppo
- Many others*

== Nizari enemies ==
=== Great Seljuk Empire ===
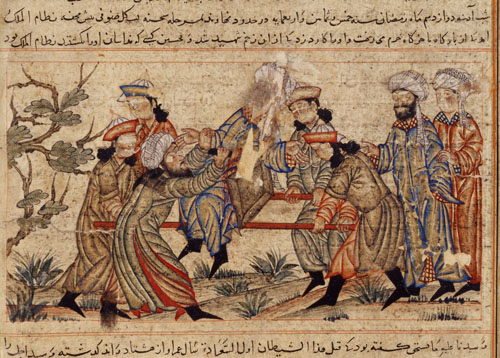
Assassination of Nizam al-Mulk

- Malikshah I, sultan of the Great Seljuk Empire (1072–1092)
  - Nizam al-Mulk X, vizier, atabeg of Malikshah I, de facto ruler (1072–1092)
  - Abu Muslim, prefect of Rayy
  - Yurun-Tash, amir of Rudbar
  - Arslan-Tash, amir
  - Qizil-Sarigh, amir
- Barkiyaruq, sultan of the Great Seljuk Empire (1094–1105)
  - Abd al-Rahman al-Simirumi X, vizier
  - Abd al-Jalil Abu al-Fath Durdanah al-Dihistani X (DOW), vizier
  - Fakhr al-Mulk ibn Nizam al-Mulk X, vizier
  - Sanjar, ruler of Khurasan (1097–1118)
    - Bursuq the Elder X, amir ispahsalar, governor of Luristan, atabeg of Sanjar, shihna of Khurasan
  - Ahmad ibn Muhammad al-Labbad X, governor of Isfahan
  - Abu Muslim X, ra'is (prefect) of Rayy
  - Anushtagin, amir
  - Unar Malikshahi X, amir sipahdar
  - Siyah(push?) X, amir
  - Arghush al-Nizami X, amir sipahdar, mamluk of Nizam al-Mulk
    - kjmš (کجمش) X, deputy of Arghush al-Nizami
  - Sarzan Malikshahi X, amir sipahsalar
  - Sunqurcha X, wali of Dihistan
  - Sultan al-Ulama' Abu al-Qasim Asfazari X, ra'is of Bayhaq
  - Abd al-Rahman Qazwini X
  - Abu Muhammad Za'farani, Hanafi scholar, military leader
  - Iskandar Sufi Qazwini X, mufti
  - Abdullah Isfahani X, qadi
  - Muntahi Alawi X, mufti of Jurjan

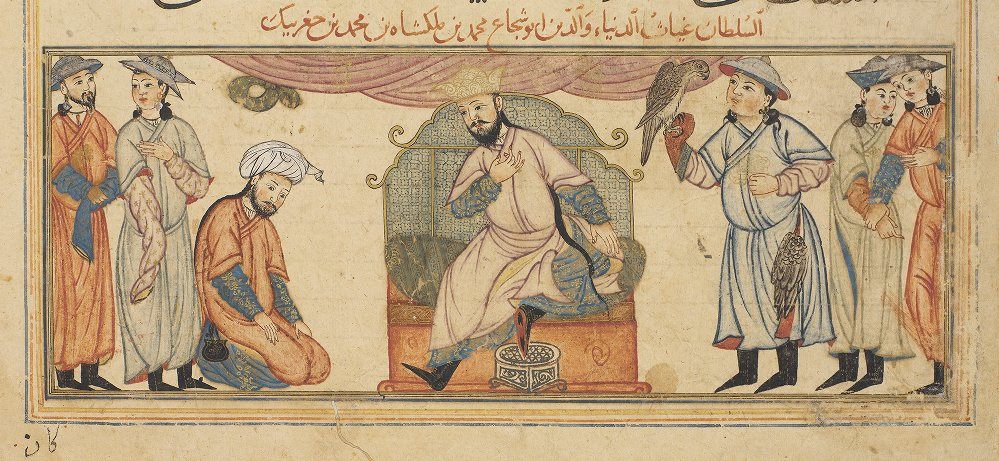
Sultan Muhammad I Tapar

- Muhammad Tapar, sultan of the Great Seljuk Empire (1105–1118)
  - Sanjar, ruler of Khurasan (1097–1118)
  - Fakhr al-Dawla Chawli, atabeg of Fars
  - Anushtagin Shirgir, atabeg, governor of Sawa
  - Mawdud ibn Altuntash X, amir ispahsalar, atabeg of Mosul, governor of Diyar Bakr and the Levant
  - Aqsunqur al-Bursuqi X, atabeg of Mosul
  - Ahmad ibn Nizam al-Mulk (WIA), vizier
  - Ahmadil ibn Ibrahim al-Kurdi X, amir of Maragha
  - Balakabak Sarmuz X, senior amir
  - Abu 'Amid X, mustawfi (accountant) of Rayy
  - Abu al-Muzaffar al-Khujandi X, chief preacher in Rayy, mufti
  - Abu Ja'far Mashshati Razi X, mufti of Rayy
  - Abu al-Hasan X, ra'is of Bayhaq
  - Ubayd Allah ibn Ali al-Khatibi X, qadi of Isfahan
  - Sa'id ibn Muhammad ibn Abd al-Rahman X, qadi of Nishapur
  - Abu al-Ala' X, mufti in Isfahan

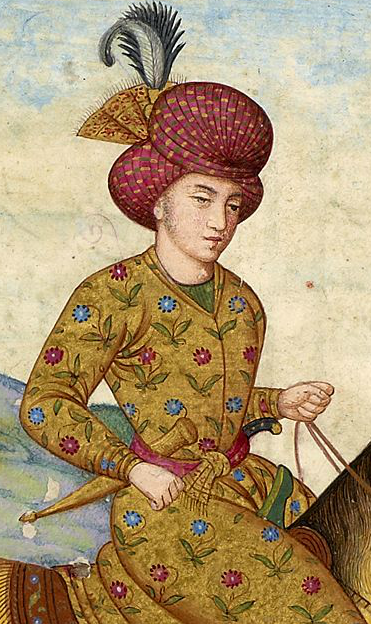
Sultan Sanjar, Persian miniature

- Sanjar, nominal head of the Seljuq dynasty (1118–1153) (the Supreme Sultan; al-sultan al-a'zam)
  - Mu'in al-Mulk Abu Nasr ibn Fazl X, vizier
  - Mu'in al-Din al-Kashi X, vizier
  - Yamin al-Dawla Khwarazmshah X, vizier, prince of the Khwarazmian dynasty
  - Bazghash, amir
  - Qajaq, amir
  - Muhammad ibn Anaz, amir
  - Ala al-Din Mahmud, governor of Turaythith
  - Aqsunqur X, mamluk, governor of Turshiz (killed while rebelling against the sultan)
  - ? X, qadi of Quhistan
  - Tughrul Mahalli X, wali of Damghan

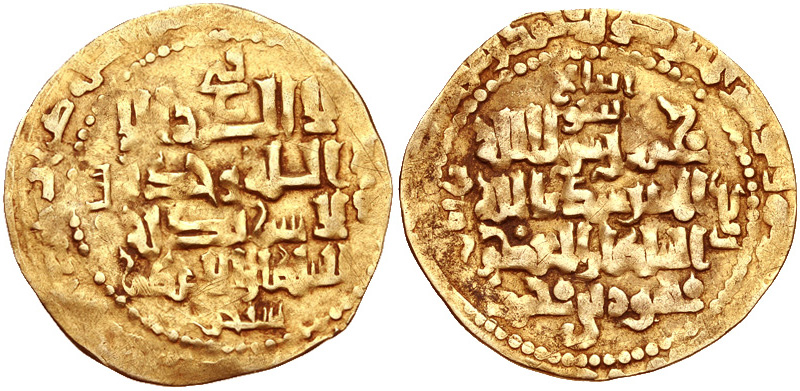
Dinar of Sultan Mahmud II

- Mahmud II, sultan of the Seljuks of Iraq (1118–1131)
  - Kamal al-Mulk Abu Talib al-Simirumi X, vizier
  - Tamurtughan (POW), amir
  - Yaran-Qush Bazdar (surrendered) , amir of Qazwin
  - Unar X, amir of Khurasan
  - Asil, commander
  - Unnamed Turkic amir in Qazwin †
  - Unnamed sons of Yaran-Qush Bazdar
  - Qimaz(?) Harami, commander
  - Sunqur Inanj, wali of Rayy
  - Abu Nasr Muhammad ibn Nasr ibn Mansur al-Harawi X, Hanafi qadi of Hamadan
  - Abd al-Latif al-Khujandi X, Shafi'i leader in Isfahan
- Da'ud X, sultan of the Seljuks of Iraq (1131–1132)
- Tughril II, sultan of the Seljuks of Iraq (1132–1135)
  - ? X, vizier
- Mas'ud, sultan of the Seljuks of Iraq (1135–1152)
  - Abbas X, amir, shihna (governor) of Rayy
    - Jawhar X, chamberlain
  - Dawlatshah Alawi X, prefect of Isfahan
  - Aqsunqur Ahmadili X, atabeg of Maragha
  - Shams Tabrizi X, ra'is (prefect) of Tabriz
  - Hasan ibn Abi al-Qasim Karkhi X, mufti of Qazwin
  - Qutlugh, wali of Qazwin
  - Aqsunqur Firuzkuhi, wali of Rayy
  - Khumar-Tash, commander
  - Unnamed qadi of Tiflis X
  - Unnamed qadi of Hamadan X
- Muhammad II ibn Mahmud, sultan
- Balak Ghazi, amir, (nominal) governor of Aleppo
- Ibn al-Khashshab X, qadi and ra'is of Aleppo, de facto ruler of Aleppo since 1113
- Nur al-Din Mahmud, Zengid amir of Damascus and Aleppo
- Janah al-Dawla X, amir of Homs
- Shams al-Mulk Alp Arslan al-Akhras (since 1113), sultan of Aleppo
  - Sa'id ibn Badi' X, ra'is of Aleppo and militia (al-ahdath) commander
- Taj al-Muluk Buri X (DOW), Burid atabeg of Damascus
  - Mufarrij ibn al-Hasan ibn al-Sufi, prefect of Damascus (ra'is al-shihna)
  - Yusuf ibn Firuz, military governor of Damascus (ra'is al-shurta)
- Nasir al-Dawla ibn al-Muhalhil X, vizier
- Garashasaf X, wāli of Kirman

=== Abbasid Caliphate ===
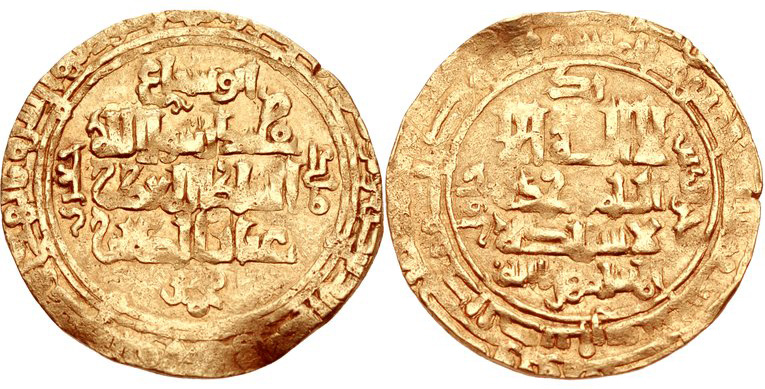
Coin minted with the names of Caliph al-Mustazhir and the Seljuk sultan Muhammad Tapar

- al-Mustazhir, caliph
- al-Mustarshid X, caliph
- al-Rashid X, caliph
- al-Mustadi, caliph
  - Adud al-Din Abu al-Faraj Muhmmad ibn Abdallah X, vizier

=== Fatimid Caliphate ===
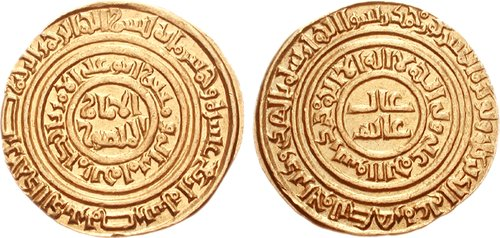
Coin of al-Amir bi-Ahkam Allah

- al-Afdal Shahanshah X, vizier and de facto ruler of Egypt
- al-Amir bi-Ahkam Allah X, Caliph-Imam
  - al-Ma'mun al-Bata'ihi, vizier
  - Khalaf ibn Mula'ib X, semi-independent amir of Homs and Apamea
  - Mus'ab ibn Mula'ib, commander

=== Ayyubid Sultanate ===
- Saladin, sultan of Syria and Egypt

=== Crusaders ===
Map of the Crusader states

Principality of Antioch

- Tancred, Regent of Antioch

Kingdom of Jerusalem

- Baldwin II, King of Jerusalem
- Conrad I X, King of Jerusalem (de facto)
- Amalric, King of Jerusalem

County of Tripoli

- Raymond II X, Count of Tripoli
  - Ralph of Merle X, knight
  - Unnamed lieutenant X
- Bohemond IV, Count of Tripoli and Prince of Antioch
  - Raymond X, heir to the throne of Antioch and Tripoli

Knights Templar

- Odo de St Amand, Grand Master (1171–1179)
  - Du Mesnil, knight

Knights Hospitaller

- Raymond du Puy, Grand Master
- Gilbert of Assailly, Grand Master
- Roger de Moulins, Grand Master
- Guérin de Montaigu, Grand Master

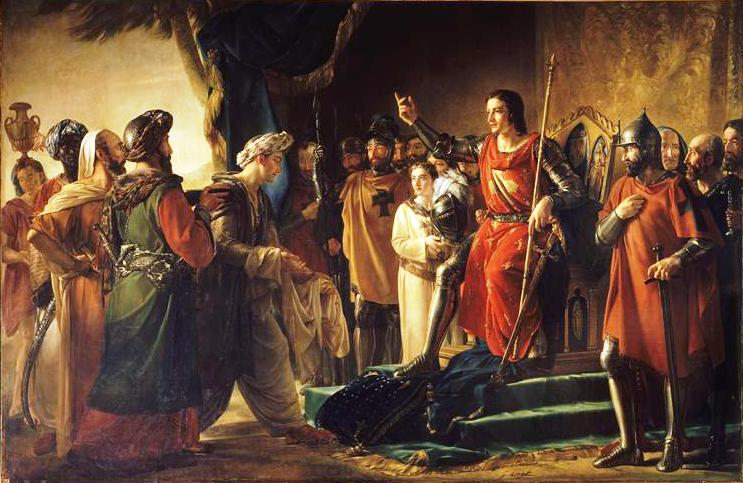
The Assassin mission to Louis IX of France, according to medieval stories.

Kingdom of France

- Louis IX of France

=== Other (semi)-independent leaders ===
- Mahdi (POW), Zaydi commandant of Alamut Castle
- Baha' al-Dawla of Sistan
- Rasamuj, commandant of Lambsar Castle
- Shah Ghazi Rustam, Bawandid ruler of Mazandaran and Gilan
  - Girdbazu X, King of Mazandaran
- Kayka'us, Paduspanid ruler (d. 1164/1165)
- Abu Hashim Alawi (POW) (executed) , Zaydi Imam
- Hadi Kiya ibn Abi Hashim X, Zaydi Imam
- Mahmashad X, Karramiyya leader
- Garshasaf †, amir, ruler in Georgia

== See also ==
- List of Isma'ili missionaries
- List of assassinations by the Assassins

== Sources ==
- Daftary, Farhad (2007). The Ismāʿı̄lı̄s: Their History and Doctrines (Second ed.). Cambridge: Cambridge University Press. ISBN 978-0-521-61636-2.
- روشن, محمد (1387). جامع التواریخ (تاریخ اسماعیلیان). مرکز پژوهشی میراث مکتوب.
- رشیدالدین فضل‌الله همدانی (1381). دانش پژوه, محمدتقی; مدرسی زنجانی, محمد (eds.). جامع التواریخ: اسماعیلیان و فاطمیان. تهران: انتشارات علمی و فرهنگی.
