= List of Isma'ili missionaries =

This is a list of Isma'ili missionaries (da'is).

== Background ==
The simplified description of the hierarchy (hudūd) of the organization of the Ismaili da'wah was as follows:

- Nāṭiq (ناطق), the messenger-propher.
- Waṣī (وصي), the prophet's "legatee".
- Imām (امام). The absolute head of the da'wah organization. All senior appointments had to be approved by him.
- Dā'ī ad-Du'āt' (داعی الدعات literally "Da'i of the Da'is"), "Chief Da'i"; also known as bāb (باب, literally "gateway") in Fatimid sources. The administrative head of the organization.
  - Pīr in Indian subcontinent know to be second to imam and no other position is higher than it other than imam. The appointment has to be done by imam and Pir is appointed usually from the imam's family unless title given after death
- Dā'ī kabīr (داعي كبير) – "Superior Da'i", "Great Da'i"
- Dā'ī (داعي, literally "missionary", plural du'āt) – "Ordinary Da'i", "Da'i". Always acting as group, not singly; except in a very small area.

See List of the Order of Assassins for examples of Nizari Ismaili Missionaries or du'āt and List of Dai of the Dawoodi Bohra or Da'i al-Mutlaq for examples of Tayyibi Isma'ilism Missionaries or du'āt.

== List ==
Rank	Name	Active years	Sect	Area of influence	Base	References
Chief Da'i	Abu Abdallah al-Khadim	since 903–913 until 919		Khurasan	Nishapur	
Chief Da'i	Al-Qadi al-Nu'man	909–974	Fatimid doctrine	Ifriqiya		
Chief Da'i	Abu Ya'qub al-Sijistani	?–971	Fatimid doctrine	Khurasan and Sijistan		
Chief Da'i	Hamid al-Din al-Kirmani	996–1021	Fatimid doctrine			
Chief Da'i	Ahmad ibn Ibrahim al-Naysaburi	10th–11th century	Fatimid doctrine		Nishapur; Cairo	
Chief Da'i	Mu'ayyad fi'l-Din al-Shirazi	1048–1078	Fatimid doctrine	Fatimid Caliphate	House of Knowledge, Cairo	
Chief Da'i	Abd al-Malik ibn Attash		Fatimid doctrine	Persia and Iraq (Seljuk territories)	Isfahan	
Da'i	Ahmad ibn Abd al-Malik ibn Attash		Fatimid doctrine	Isfahan	Shahdiz fortress, Isfahan	
Chief Da'i	Hassan-i Sabbah	1090–1124	Fatimid, later Nizari	Daylam, later Nizari Isma'ili state	Alamut Castle	
Chief Da'i	Abu Hamza				Arrajan	
Chief Da'i	Kiya Buzurg-Ummid	1124–1138	Nizari	Nizari Isma'ili state	Alamut Castle	
Chief Da'i	Muhammad Buzurg Ummid	1138–1162	Nizari	Nizari Isma'ili state	Lambasar Castle, Alamut Castle	
Chief Da'i	Al-Hakim al-Munajjim	died in 1103	Nizari	Syria	Aleppo	
Chief Da'i	Abu Tahir al-Sa'igh		Nizari	Syria	Aleppo and Afamiyya	
Chief Da'i	Bahram al-Da'i		Nizari	Syria	Damascus (civilian base) and Baniyas fortress (military base)	
Chief Da'i	Isma'il al-Ajami		Nizari	Syria		
Da'i	Abu'l Fath of Sarmin		Nizari	part of Syria		
Chief Da'i	Abu Muhammad		Nizari	Syria	Al-Kahf Castle	
Da'i	Rashid ad-Din Sinan	~1160–1163	Nizari	Basra District		
Chief Da'i	Rashid ad-Din Sinan	from 1163–1164 to 1192–1193	Nizari	Syria	Al-Kahf Castle	
Chief Da'i	Abu Mansur ibn Muhammad or Nasr al-'Ajami	since 1192 or 1193	Nizari	Syria		
Chief Da'i	Kamal al-Din al-Hasan ibn Masud	1222–1223	Nizari	Syria		
Chief Da'i	Majd al-Din	1226–1227	Nizari	Syria		
Chief Da'i	Siraj al-Din Muzaffar ibn al-Husayn	1227, 1238	Nizari	Syria		
Chief Da'i	Taj al-Din Abu al-Futuh ibn Muhammad	1239–1240, 1249	Nizari	Syria		
Chief Da'i	Radi al-Din Abu al-Ma'ali	1258–1261	Nizari	Syria		
Chief Da'i	Khwaja Qasim		Nizari	Quhistan		
Da'i	Abu Ishaq Quhistani		Qasim-Shahi Nizari	Quhistan		
Da'i	Abu Firas	until 1530 or 1540	Nizari	Syria	Maynaqa Fortress	
Chief Da'i	Abu Abdallah al-Shi'i		Fatimid Caliphate	Yemen and North Africa		
Chief Da'i	Hamdan Qarmat			Lower Iraq	Salamiyah	
Chief Da'i	Abdallah ibn Maymūn Al-Qaddāḥ					
Chief Da'i	Maymūn Al-Qaddāḥ					
Da'i	Zakarawayh ibn Mihrawayh			Among the Banu Tamim	Saylahin	
Da'i	Abu Muhammad Abdan					
Chief Da'i	Jawdhar		Fatimid Caliphate	North Africa		
Chief Da'i	Amir al-Zawahi		Fatimid Caliphate	Yemen		
Chief Da'i	Ali al-Sulayhi		Fatimid Caliphate	Yemen		
Da'i	Abu Yaqub al-Sijistani		Fatimid Caliphate			
Chief Da'i	Musa ibn Dawud		Fatimid Caliphate	Fars		
Da'i	Al-Mukarram Ahmad		Fatimid Caliphate	Yemen		
Da'i	Da'i Anjudani		Nizari		Iran	
Chief Da'i	Abu Hatim Ahmad ibn Hamdan al-Razi		Fatimid Caliphate	Ray and Central Persia	Ray	
Chief Da'i	Hamid al-Din al-Kirmani		Fatimid Caliphate	Iraq and Iran		
Da'i (Hujjat-i Khurasan)	Nasir Khusraw	1052–1088	Fatimid doctrine	Khurasan	Yamgan District (1060–1088)	
Da'i	Al-Mukarram Ahmad		Fatimid Caliphate	Yemen	Jibla, Yemen	
Chief Da'i	Dhu'ayb ibn Musa		Sulayhid dynasty	Yemen	Hooth	
Da'i	Abd al-Malik al-Kawkabi			Jibal	Gerdkuh	
Da'i	Lamak ibn Malik		Sulayhid dynasty	Yemen		
Da'i	Yahya ibn Lamak		Sulayhid dynasty	Yemen		
Da'i	Abdullah (Ismaili Mustaali Missionary)		Fatimid Caliphate	Gujarat	Khambhat	
Da'i	Syedi Hasan Feer		Taiyabi	Gujarat	Denmaal	
Da'i	Syedi Fakhruddin		Fatimid Caliphate	Rajasthan	Galiakot	
Da'i	Syedi Nuruddin		Fatimid Caliphate	Maharashtra	Don Gaon	
Da'i	Abdul Qadir Hakimuddin		Taiyabi	Madhya Pradesh	Burhanpur	
Pir	Prannath / Imam Mahdi		Nizari (Ismaili Missionary)	Madhya Pradesh	Panna	
Da'i	Syedi Bava Mulla Khan		Taiyabi	Madhya Pradesh	Rampura	
Pir	Pir Sadardin		Nizari	Sindh		
Da'i	Sulayman bin Hassan		Taiyabi	India	Ahmedabad	
Da'i	Abdul Hussain Jivaji		Taiyabi	India	Nagpur	
Da'i	Muhammad Amiruddin		Taiyabi	India	Nagpur	
Da'i	Taher Fakhruddin		Taiyabi	India	Thane	
Da'i	Al-Fakhri Abdullah		Taiyabi	Hijaz	Najran	
Da'i	Haatim Zakiyuddin		Taiyabi	Gujarat	Vadodara	
Da'i	Ahmad bin Abdullah bin Maymun		Fatimid Caliphate	Iran and Iraq	Salamiyah	
Da'i	Abu'l-Qasim al-Hasan ibn Faraj ibn Ḥawshab Mansur al-Yaman		Fatimid Caliphate	Yemen		
Da'i	Ali ibn al-Fadl al-Jayshani	883–915	Fatimid doctrine (until 911) / Qarmatian doctrine (from 911)	Yemen		
Da'i	Khalaf al-Hallaj		Fatimid Caliphate	Iran		
Da'i	Abu Abdullah Muhammad bin Ahmad an-Nasafi		Fatimid Caliphate	Iran	Ray	
Da'i	Ja'far ibn Mansur al-Yaman		Fatimid Caliphate	Egypt	Cairo	
Da'i	Qadi Abul Hussain Ali bin Noman		Fatimid Caliphate	Egypt	Cairo	
Pir	Shamsuddin Sabzwari		Nizari	Pakistan	Multan	
Da'i	Taj Mughal		Nizari	Pakistan	Gilgit and Hunza	
Pir	Pir Hasan Kabiruddin		Nizari	Pakistan	Uchh	
Pir	Pir Tajuddin		Nizari	Pakistan	Lahore	
Da'i	Sayed Imam Shah		Nizari	Pakistan	Uchh, see Satpanth for further information	
Da'i	Sayed Rehmatullah Shah		Nizari	Gujrat and Kutchh		
Da'i	Sayed Nurbaksh		Nizari	Jammu and Kashmir		
Da'i	Mir Shamsuddin II		Nizari	Jammu and Kashmir		
Da'i	Badiuddin Khwaja Kassim		Nizari	Iran	Anjudan	
Da'i	Syedi Lukman ji		Taiyabi	India	Udaipur	
Da'i	Khanji Pheer		Taiyabi	India	Udaipur	
Da'i	Zurayids		Hafizi	Yemen	Aden	
Da'i	Ibn Selim el-Aswani		Fatimid Caliphate	Sudan		
Da'i	Nasir al-Din Nasir Hunzai		Nizari	Pakistan	Hunza Valley	
Da'i	Nizari Quhistani		Nizari	Iran	Birjand	
Da'i	Ismail Gangji		Nizari	India		
Da'i	Malik Tayfur Anjudani		Nizari	Iran		
Da'i	Sayed Alam Shah		Nizari	India	Gujarat	
Da'i	Sayed Ali Shah		Nizari	India	Gujarat	
Da'i	Sayed Bakir Shah		Nizari	India	Gujarat	
Da'i	Sayed Nur Muhammad Shah		Nizari	India	Gujarat	
Da'i	Muhammad bin Sa'd bin Daud surnamed ar- Rafnah		Nizari	Syria		
Da'i	Nuruddin Ahmad		Nizari	Syria		
Da'i	Abul Ma'ali Hatim bin Imran, eminently known as Ibn Zahra		Nizari	Syria		
Da'i	Sayed Malang Shah		Nizari	Central Asia	Shagnan	
Da'i	Sayed Khamush Shah Shirazi		Nizari	Central Asia	Shagnan	
Da'i	Asma bint Shihab		Taiyabi	Yemen	Jibla, Yemen	
Da'i	Arwa al-Sulayhi		Taiyabi	Yemen	Jibla, Yemen	
Da'i	Amira Darrab		Fatimid Caliphate	Iran	Ray	
Da'i	Hussain Qaini		Nizari	Iran	Qaen	
Da'i	Abul Khattab Muhammad bin Abi Zaynab Maqlas al-Asadi al-Kufi		Ismaili	Iraq	Kufa	
Da'i	Hasan bin Muhammad bin Kiya Buzurg		Nizari	Iran	Alamut	
Da'i	Abu Jabala Ibrahim bin Ghassan		Fatimid Caliphate	Egypt	Cairo	
Da'i	Jabir al-Manufi		Fatimid Caliphate	Lebanon	Tyre	
Da'i	Abul Fawaris al-Hasan bin Muhammad al-Mimadhi		Fatimid Caliphate	Israel	Acre	
Da'i	Abul Hussain Ahmad bin Muhammad bin al-Kumayt		Fatimid Caliphate	Israel	Askelon	
Da'i	Abu Muhammad al-Tabari		Fatimid Caliphate	Iran	Tabaristan	
Da'i	Abul Hasan al-Halabi		Fatimid Caliphate	Syria	Aleppo	
Da'i	Abu Tamim Abul Kassim al-Bukhari		Fatimid Caliphate	Uzbekistan	Bukhara	
Da'i	Abul Wafa al-Daylami		Fatimid Caliphate	Iran	Daylam	
Da'i	Ibn Abi'l Dibs		Fatimid Caliphate	Syria	Damascus	
Da'i	Khuzayma bin Abi Khuzayma		Fatimid Caliphate	Iraq	Baghdad	
Da'i	Abu Abdullah bin al-Naman		Fatimid Caliphate	Iraq	Baghdad	
Da'i	Abu Abdullah al-Khadim		Fatimid Caliphate	Iran	Nishapur	
Da'i	Abul Abbas		Fatimid Caliphate	Tunisia	Mahdia	
Da'i	Abdullah bin Abbas al-Shawiri		Fatimid Caliphate	Yemen	Ahwaz	
Da'i	Al-Farazdaq		Ali ibn Husayn Zayn al-Abidin	Kuwait	Kazma	
Chief Da'i	Badr al-Jamali		Fatimid Caliphate	Egypt	Cairo	
Da'i	Zayn bin Abi Faraj		Nizari	Syria		
Da'i	Ibrahim bin Abi'l Fawaris		Nizari	Syria		
Da'i	Ismail		Nizari	Syria		
Da'i	Nasir ad-Dawla Iftagin at-Turki		Nizari	Egypt	Alexandria	
Da'i	Jalal ad-Dawla bin Ammar		Nizari	Egypt	Alexandria	
Pir	Pir Satgur Noor/Sayyid Nooruddin Noor Muhammad		Nizari	India	Gujarat	
Da'i	Pir Sayed Muinuddin Hasan		Nizari	Iran	Sabzevar	
Da'i	Sayed Salauddin		Nizari	Iran	Sabzevar	
Da'i	Ad-Darazi		Druze	Egypt	Cairo	
Da'i	Hamza ibn-'Ali ibn-Ahmad		Druze	Egypt	Cairo	
Da'i	Al-Muqtana Baha'uddin		Druze	Syria	Beit Jann	
Da'i	Hasan al-Akhram al-Farghani		Druze	Egypt	Cairo	
Pir	Pir Nasiruddin		Nizari Satpanth	Punjab	Uchh	
Pir	Pir Sahib'adin		Nizari Satpanth	India		
Da'i	Sayed Ruknuddin		Nizari Satpanth	India		
Da'i	Sayed Badruddin		Nizari Satpanth	India		
Da'i	Sayed Shamsuddin II		Nizari Satpanth	India		
Da'i	Sayed Ghiasuddin		Nizari Satpanth	India		
Da'i	Khaki Khorasani		Nizari	Iran	Khorasan	
Da'i	Ali Quli Raqqami		Nizari	Iran	Khorasan	
Da'i	Khwajah Qasim Tushtari		Nizari	Iran	Alamut	
Da'i	Muhammad Abu al-Makarim		Nizari	Syria		
Da'i	Shihab al-Din Abu Firas		Nizari	Syria		
Da'i	Abul Haytham Gorgani		Fatimid Caliphate	Iran	Gorgan	
Da'i	Mohammed ibn Sork		Fatimid Caliphate	Iran	Nishapur	
Da'i	Sayyed Didarali		Nizari	India		
Da'i	Sayyed Mustakali		Nizari	India		
Da'i	Sayyed Nour Baksh		Nizari	India		
Da'i	Sayyed Auliya Ali		Nizari	India		
Da'i	Sayyed Amir Ahmed		Ismaili	Arabia	Medina	
Da'i	Sayyed Nooruddin		Ismaili	Arabia	Medina	
Da'i	Sayyed Nasser Mohammed		Nizari	Iran		
Da'i	Pir Qasim Shah		Nizari	Iran		
Da'i	Sayyed Noor Mehdi		Nizari	India		
Da'i	Sayyed Hyder Shah		Nizari	India		
Da'i	Ibrahim Jusab Varteji		Nizari	India		
Da'i	Assad bin Kassim Al-Ajami		Fatimid Caliphate	Syria	Aleppo	
Da'i	Ibrahim bin Ismail Al Ajami		Fatimid Caliphate	Syria	Aleppo	
Da'i	Pir Sayyed Alauddin		Nizari	Afghanistan	Badakshan	
Da'i	Ahmad Hadi		Fatimid Caliphate	Yemen		
Da'i	Sayyed Zahiruddin		Nizari	India		
Da'i	Rodaki		Fatimid Caliphate	Central Asia		
Da'i	Sayyed Shah Qalandar		Nizari	India		
Da'i	Pir Mahmud Shah		Nizari	Iran	Sabzevar	
Da'i	Pir Muhibuddin		Nizari	Iran	Sabzevar	
Da'i	Pir Muhammad Zaman		Nizari	Iran		
Da'i	Pir Baba Hashem Shah		Nizari	Iran		
Da'i	Pir Mirza Shah Qasimali		Nizari	Iran		
Da'i	Pir Abul Hassan Ali		Nizari	Iran		
Da'i	Pir Mehrab Beg		Nizari	Iran		
Da'i	Seyyed Ali Asghar Beg		Nizari	Iran		
Da'i	Seyyed Akbar Ali Beg		Nizari	Iran		
Da'i	Mirza Mohammed Baqir		Nizari	Iran		
Da'i	Mohammed bin Ali bin Hasan As-Souri		Nizari	Syria		
Da'i	Seyyed Lal Shah Baz Qalandar		Nizari	India		
Da'i	Pir Khaliquddin		Nizari	Iran		
Pir	Pir Ismailbhai Gangji		Nizari	India		
Da'i	Seyyed Islamuddin		Nizari	India		
Da'i	Seyyed Imamuddin Indra		Nizari	India		
Da'i	Hatem Bin Mahmoud bin Zahrah		Nizari	Syria		
Da'i	Seyyed Hasan Shah		Nizari	India		
Da'i	Pir Ghalibuddin		Fatimid Caliphate	North Africa		
Da'i	Seyyed Gheb Shah		Nizari	India		
Da'i	Firuz		Fatimid Caliphate	Yemen		
Da'i	Anushtakin Al-Duzbari		Fatimid Caliphate	Syria		
Da'i	Abdul Majid		Fatimid Caliphate	Yemen		
Da'i	Seyyed Adam Mehdi		Nizari	India		
Da'i	Aga Jehangir Shah		Nizari	India		
Da'i	Seyyed Bala Shah		Nizari	India		
Da'i	Pir Abdul Momin		Nizari	India		
Da'i	Pir Salamuddin		Nizari	India		
Da'i	Seyyed Khaliq Shah		Nizari	India		
Da'i	Seyyed Jalaluddin		Nizari	India		
Da'i	Seyyed Awal Shah		Nizari	India		
Da'i	Pir Aga Aziz		Nizari	Afghanistan		
Da'i	Khuzaima Qutbuddin		Taiyabi	India		
Da'i	Tayyebhai Razzak		Taiyabi	India		
Da'i	Ibn Hatim		Taiyabi	Yemen		
Da'i	Abu Abdullah Ja'far ibn al-Aswad ibn al-Haytham		Fatimid Caliphate	Tunisia	Kairouan	
Da'i	Ali ibn Muhammad al-Iyadi		Fatimid Caliphate	Tunisia	Kairouan	
Da'i	Fidai Khorasani		Nizari	Iran		
Da'i	Sayed Munir		Nizari	Afghanistan	Shagnan, Badakhshan	
Da'i	Abu Aly A. Aziz		Nizari			
Da'i	Kassim Ali		Nizari			
Da'i	Noormohomed Rahimtullah		Nizari			
Da'i	Noordin Amlani		Nizari			
Da'i	Alibhai Nanji		Nizari			
Da'i	Jaffer Ali A. Bhalwani		Nizari			
Da'i	Jaffer Ali Muhammad Somji Sufi		Nizari			
Da'i	Juma Bhagat Ismail		Nizari			
Da'i	Bandali Bhagat Ismail		Nizari			
Da'i	Nurullah Bhagat Ismail		Nizari			
Da'i	Karam Hussain		Nizari			
Da'i	Kara Ruda		Nizari			
Da'i	Kassim Ali Muhammad Jaffer		Nizari			
Da'i	Kassim Ali R. Paroo		Nizari			
Da'i	Khuda Baksh Talib		Nizari			
Da'i	Muhammad Murad Ali Juma		Nizari			
Da'i	Sultanali Nazarali Walji		Nizari			
Da'i	Abul Kassim Muhammad Kuhpayai known as Amiri Shirazi or Kassim Amiri		Nizari		Iran	
Da'i	Sayed Dadu or Pir Dadu		Nizari		India	
Da'i	Sayed Abdul Nabi		Nizari		India	
Da'i	Pir Shihabuddin Shah		Nizari		India	
Da'i	Abu Al Fath		Nizari		Syria	
Da'i	Khalaf ibn Mula'ib		Musta'li		Syria	
Da'i	Abu'l Hasan Sinan bin Suleman bin Muhammad		Nizari		Iraq	
Da'i	Zahiri Faryabi		Nizari		Daylam	
Chief Da'i	Kamaluddin Kohistani		Nizari		Quhistan	
Da'i	Shamsuddin bin Daulatshah		Nizari		Syria	
Da'i	Shihabuddin bin Ibrahim al-Mainaqi		Nizari		Syria	
Da'i	Muhammad bin al-Jazirah		Nizari		Syria	
Da'i	Abu Mansur al-Yameni al-Shadili		Nizari		Syria	
Da'i	Muhammad Abul Makrim		Nizari		Syria	
Da'i	Muhammad bin al-Fazal bin Ali al-Baza'i		Nizari		Syria	
Da'i	Khayr Khwah Herati or Muhammad Reza bin Sultan Hussain Ghuriyan Herati		Nizari		Afghanistan	
Da'i	Sayed Suhrab Wali Badakhshani		Nizari		Afghanistan	
Da'i	Sayed Umar Yamghani		Nizari		Afghanistan	
Da'i	Zayn al-Abidin bin Hussain bin Khushnam Angawani		Nizari		Iran	
Da'i	Sayed Shah Zahur		Nizari		Yasin and Punial	
Da'i	Sayed Bakir Shah		Nizari		Yasin and Punial	
Da'i	Sayed Karim Hyder		Nizari		Yasin and Punial	
Da'i	Sayed Shah Ardbil		Nizari		Gilgit and Hunza	
Da'i	Sayed Hussain Ardbil		Nizari		Gilgit and Hunza	
Da'i	Sayed Yaqut Shah		Nizari		Gilgit and Hunza	
Da'i	Sayed Shah Abdur Rahim		Nizari		Gilgit and Hunza	
Da'i	Sayed Ghulam Ali Shah		Nizari		Gilgit and Hunza	
Da'i	Khwaja Shah Talib		Nizari		Gilgit and Hunza	
Da'i	Mirza Ismail		Nizari		Gilgit and Hunza	
Da'i	Khwaja Shahid		Nizari		Gilgit and Hunza	
Chief Da'i	Sheikh al-Hajj Khidr		Nizari		Syria	
Chief Da'i	Sheikh Muhammad al-Suwaydani		Nizari		Syria	
Chief Da'i	Mu'ayyad al-Din Muzaffar ibn Ahmad Mustawfi		Nizari		Iran	
Chief Da'i	Qadi Tajuddin Mardanshah		Nizari		Iran	
Da'i	Maulana Dakhli		Nizari		India	
Chief Da'i	Shawiri	915-?	Fatimid doctrine	Yemen		
Chief Da'i	Abu Ibrahim Asadabadi	12th Century	Nizari	Syria		

== See also ==
- List of Ismaili imams
- List of Dai of Dawoodi Bohra
- Alavi Bohras
- Atba-i-Malak
- Sulaymani
- Da'i al-Mutlaq
- Dawah
