= List of assassinations by the Order of the Assassins =

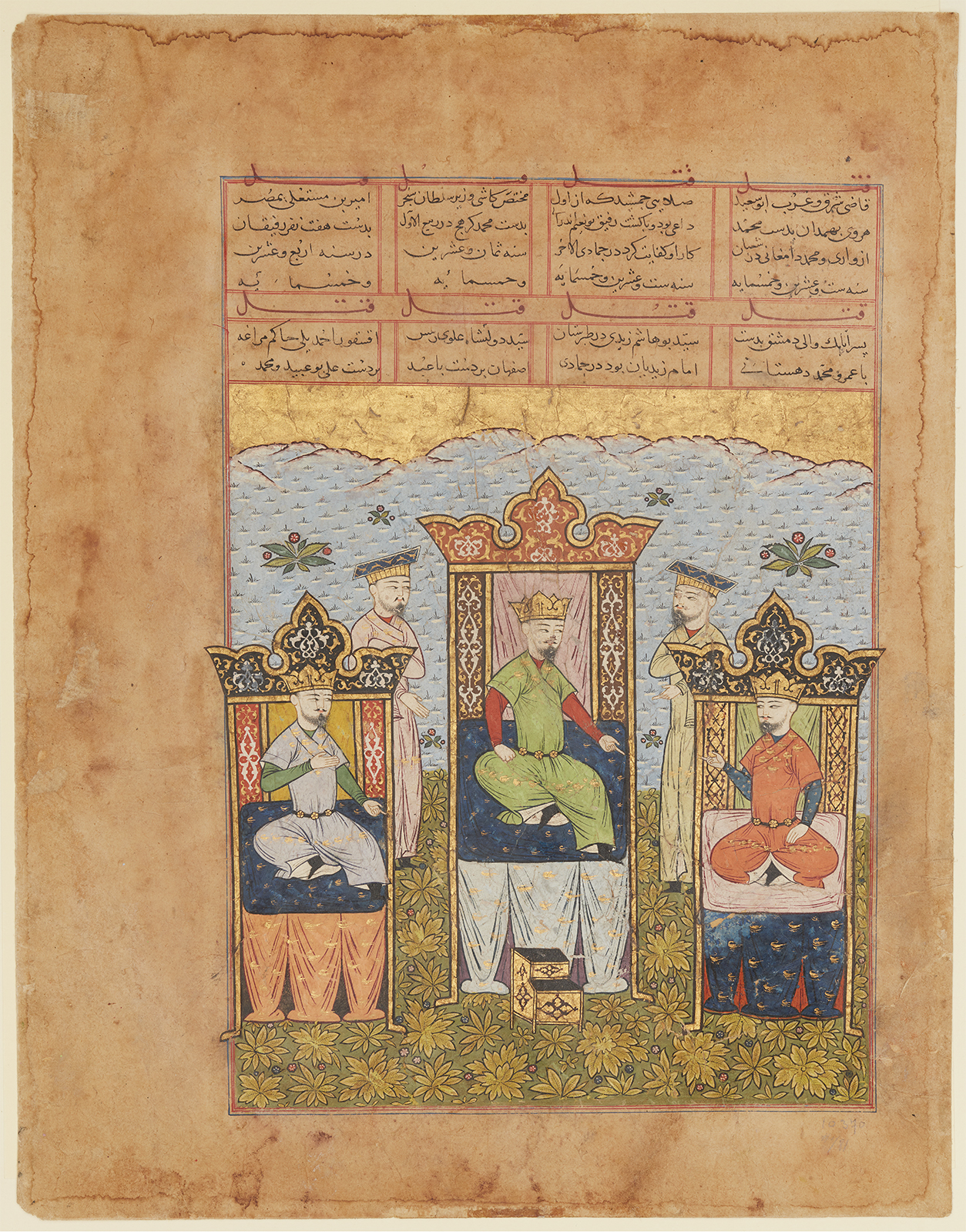
An obituary listing eight victims of the Nizari Ismaʿili assassins. Folio from a manuscript assembled at the court of Shah Rukh (r. 1405–1447), Iran, Herat (now Afghanistan), early 15th century

The following is a list of assassinations and assassination attempts attributed to the Assassins (the Nizaris of Alamut), who were active between the 11th and 13th centuries in West Asia, Central Asia, and Egypt.

== Background ==
The Assassins were a group of Nizari Ismaili Shia Muslims that, by capturing or building impregnable forts, established a "state" of their own inside the hostile territories of the Seljuk Empire, a Sunni Muslim government, first in Persia and later in Iraq and the Levant. Lacking a conventional army, in order to survive, they started using unconventional tactics such as assassination of prominent enemy figures and psychological warfare. The Order lasted until the Mongol conquest of Mesopotamia.

== Assassination ==
The precise ideology that motivated the assassins is unclear. Most of the assassinations by the Nizaris took place during the first decades of their struggle, which helped them to create a local political power. Their first and boldest assassination was that of Nizam al-Mulk, the vizier and de facto ruler of the Seljuk Empire.

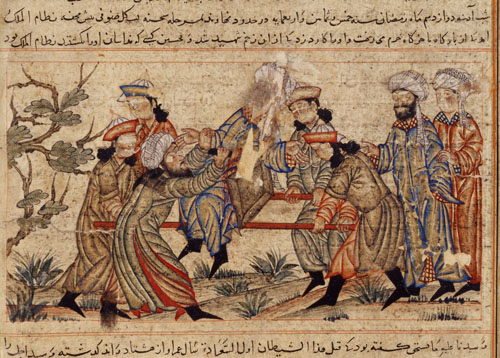
Assassination of the Seljuq vizier Nizam al-Mulk

[The assassination of Nizam al-Mulk] was the first of a long series of such attacks which, in a calculated war of terror, brought sudden death to sovereigns, princes, generals, governors, and even divines who had condemned Ismaili doctrines and authorized the suppression of those who professed them.

— Bernard Lewis.

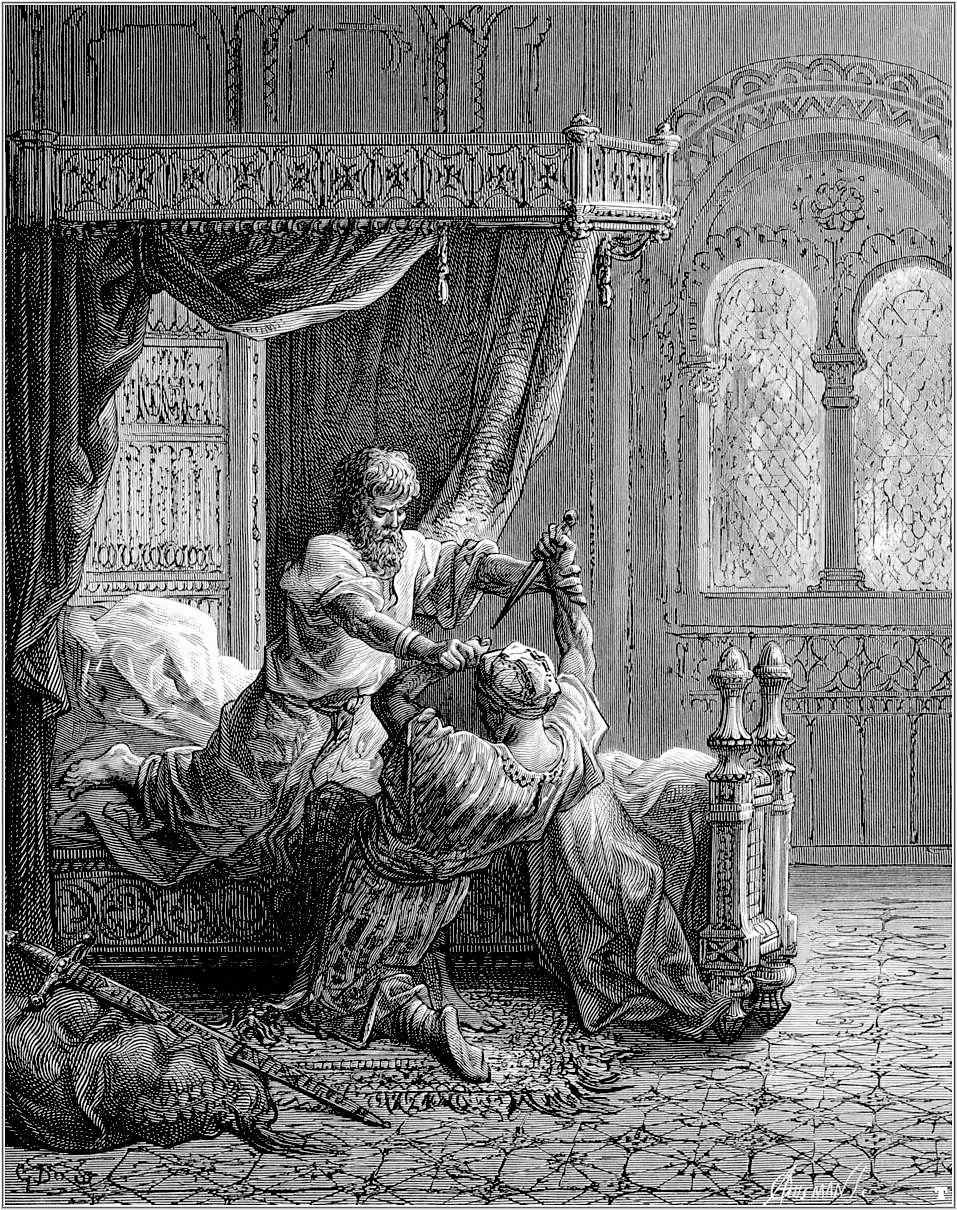
Edward I of England thwarts an assassination attempt. The assassination attempt contributed to the termination of the Ninth Crusade.

Those assassinated were usually the enemies of the Nizari Ismaili sect, but also sometimes people of political importance who were killed in exchange for money paid by some local ruler. This tactic caused resentment against them, and there is a correlation between the assassinations and subsequent massacres of the Nizaris. This tactic gradually declined and the later attributed assassinations are probably of local origination. It should be taken into account that medieval Arabic sources generally tend to attribute most of the assassinations of this period to the Ismailis.

The assassins gained access to the victims through betrayal of confidence and carried out the attack in a ritual manner. Some of the assassins were sleeper cells, notably by befriending or being employed by the victim, sometimes remaining unrecognized for years.

The names of the assassin and their victims were written in a roll of honor kept in Alamut Castle, recorded by later Muslim authors.

== List ==
Victim(s)	Description	Outcome	Date	Location	Assassin(s)	Method	Notes
Nizam al-Mulk	Seljuq vizier and de facto ruler	killed	1092, October 14	Sahnah, Seljuq Empire	assassin disguised as dervish; killed or fled or survived	knife	Their first and most notable action.
Ahmad ibn Muhammad al-Labbad (أحمد بن محمد اللباد)	governor of Isfahan	killed	1093	Isfahan, Seljuq Empire	unknown	unknown	
Unar Malikshahi (انر ملکشاهی)	amir sipahdar	killed	1096, January-February	unknown	Husayn Khwarezmi (حسین خوارزمی)	unknown	
Abd al-Rahman Qazwini		killed	490 AH	unknown	a Khurasani rafiq	unknown	
Abu Muslim	ra'is (prefect) of Ray	killed	1095	unknown	a friend	unknown	
Abd al-Rahman al-Simirumi (عبد الرحمان السميرمي)	vizier of Seljuq sultan Barkayaruq	killed	1097	unknown	Abu Tahir al-Arrani (أبو طاهر الأراني); fled	unknown	
Arghush al-Nizami (أرغوش النظامي)	amir sipahdar, mamluk of Nizam al-Mulk with close relation to Barkayaruq	killed	1095 or 1097	Ray, Seljuq Empire	Abd al-Rahman al-Khurasani (عبد الرحمان الخراساني); killed immediately	unknown	
Bursuq the Elder	senior commander (Amir Ispahsalar) under Barkiyaruq, newly appointed atabeg of Sanjar, shihna of Khurasan	killed	September 1097	near Sarakhs, Seljuq Empire	a Quhistani rafiq (companion)	unknown	The Shiite Seljuk vizier Majd al-Mulk Balasani was murdered for being accused of involvement.
unnamed	qadi	killed	1098	unknown	his brother	unknown	
Unar and Siyah (Siyahpush?)	amir (senior commanders)	killed	1099	near Sawa, Seljuq Empire	team of 3; 2 killed, 1 survived [Husayn or Hasan Khwarezmi]	knife	
kjmš (کجمش)	deputy of Arghush al-Nizami	killed			Ibrahim Damawandi (ابراهیم دماوندی)		Killed together with his son-in-law.
Sarzan Malikshahi (سرزن ملکشاهی)	amir sipahsalar	killed			Ibrahim Khurashani (ابراهیم خوراشانی)		
Hadi Kiya (هادی کیا) the Alavid	Imam and missionary in Gilan	killed			Ibrahim and Muhammad Kuhi		
Abu al-Fath Durdanah Dihistani (ابوالفتح دردانه دهستانی)	vizier of Barkiyaruq	killed			a Rus'(?) ghulam		
Iskandar Sufi Qazwini (اسکندر صوفی قزوینی)		killed			a Quhistani rafiq		
Sunqurche (سنقرچه) (or منعورحه)	wali of Dihistan, Amul	killed			Muhammad Dihistani (محمد دهستانی)		
Balakabak Sarmuz (بلاكبك سرموز) or buklabk srmz (بیکلابک سرمز)	senior commander (amir)	killed	1099	entrance of Sultan Mahmud II's house in Isfahan, Seljuq Empire	team of 2; 1 killed, 1 fled	unknown	
Abu al-Muzaffar al-Khujandi (أبو المظفر الخجندي)	chief preacher in Ray (mufti of Isfahan?)	killed	1102/1103	Rayy, Seljuq Empire; coming down from minbar	Abu al-Fath Sijzi (ابو الفتح سجزی); killed immediately	unknown	
Abu 'Amid (ابو عمید) (or ابو نیم)	mustawfi (accountant) of Rayy	killed			Rustam Damawandi (رستم دماوندی)		
Abu Ja'far Mashshati Razi (ابوجعقر مشاطی رازی)	mufti of Rayy	killed			Muhammad Damawandi (محمد دماوندی)		
Abu al-Qasim Mufti Karaji Qazwini (ابو القاسم مفتی کرجی قزوینی)		killed			Hasan Damawandi (حسن دماوندی)		
Abu al-Hasan (ابوالحسن)	ra'is of Bayhaq	killed			Fida'i (Haji?) Damawandi		He was marching against (?) Maymun-Diz.
Abu al-Faraj Qaratakin (ابو الفرج قراتکین)	17 Ramadan 472 AH	killed	Rayy, Seljuk Empire				
Abd al-Jalil al-Dihistani (أبو الجليل الدهستانی)	vizier of Seljuq Sultan Barkayaruq	died of wounds	1102/1103	Isfahan's gate, Seljuq Empire	a youth	unknown	
Janah ad-Dawla	emir of Homs	killed	1103, May	Great Mosque of Homs, Emirate of Homs (Syria)	team of 3		Apparently ordered by al-Hakim al-Munajjim
Abu Ja'far al-Mashatt (أبو جعفر المشط)	Shafi'i leader in Ray	killed	1104	Ray's mosque, Seljuq Empire	unknown	unknown	
Abu al-Ala Sa'id ibn Abi Muhammad al-Nisaburi (أبو العلاء سعيد بن أبي محمد النيسابوري)	qadi of Isfahan	killed	1105/1106	Isfahan's mosque, Seljuq Empire	unknown	unknown	
Khalaf ibn Mula'ib	Fatimid emir of Afamiyya	killed	1106, February 3	inside Qalaat al-Madiq (Afamiyya), Emirate of Apamea (under Fatimid Caliphate)	team; fled	dagger, struck in the abdomen; harba (حربة, "spear") per one source	Planned by Abu Tahir al-Sa'igh, Ridwan, and a certain Abu'l Fath of Sarmin
unnamed	lieutenant (amir) of Seljuq Sultan Muhammad I Tapar	wounded	1107	Shahdiz, Seljuq Empire	a fida'i		After a failed negotiation during the Siege of Shahdiz. The victim was a particularly anti-Nizari commander in the Seljuq camp.
Abu al-Fath Fakhr al-Mulk ibn Nizam al-Mulk	vizier of Seljuq sultan Barkiyaruq (Sanjar?)	killed	1106/1107	Nishapur, Seljuk Empire	dynmyn(?) Damghani (دینمین[?] دامغانی), a petitioner; arrested, tried, executed	knife	
Abu Ahmad Kaysan (Dawlatshahi?) Qazwini		killed			a Quhistani rafiq, accompanied by 10 other rafiqs		
Abdullah Isfahani	qadi	killed	Safar 493 AH		Abu al-Abbas Naqib Mashhadi (ابو العباس نقیب مشهدی)		
Abu al-Ala' (ابو العلاء)	scholar and mufti of Isfahan	killed	495 AH	Jameh Mosque of Isfahan, Isfahan, Seljuk Empire	a rafiq		
Sultan al-Ulama' Abu al-Qasim Asfazari (سلطان العلماء ابو القاسم اسفزازی)	ra'is of Bayhaq	killed	Shawwal 495 AH		Muhammad Biyari (محمد بیاری)		
Mahmashad (محمشاد)	Karramiyya leader	killed	496 AH	Great Mosque of Nishapur, Seljuk Empire	Abd al-Malik Razi (عبد الملک رازی)		
Sabbak al-Jurjani (سباک الجرجاني)	scholar	killed	496 AH		Hassan Siraj (حسن سراج)		For insulting the Shia Imam, Ali.
Abu al-Ala' (ابوالعلاء)	scholar in service of sultan Muhammad I Tapar	killed			Muhammad Sayyad (محمد صیاد)		For insulting the Shia Imam, Ali.
Ubayd Allah ibn Ali al-Khatibi (عبيد الله بن علي الخطيبي)	qadi of Isfahan, leader of the anti-Ismaili reaction there	killed	1108/1109, during Friday prayers	Hamadan's mosque	1 assassin, got between him and his bodyguard	knife	
Abu al-Mahasin Abd al-Wahid al-Ruwayni (أبو المحاسن عبد الوحيد الرويني)	Shafi'i leader	killed	1108/1109	Amol's mosque	unknown	knife	Attributed only by some sources to the Nizaris.
Sa'id ibn Muhammad ibn Abd al-Rahman (سعيد بن محمد بن عبد الرحمان)	qadi of Nishapur	killed	1108/1109, on Eid al-Fitr		killed	unknown	
Ahmad ibn Nizam al-Mulk	vizier of Seljuq Sultan Barkayaruq	wounded	1109/1110	Baghdad	Husayn Quhistani (حسین قهستانی); assassin arrested, confessed, his companions killed	knives	For his expedition against Alamut.
Abu Harb Isa ibn Zayd	a wealthy Persian merchant	mission failed	1111	Aleppo, Emirate of Aleppo			
Sharaf al-Din Mawdud ibn Altuntash	atabeg of Mosul, amir ispahsalar, governor of Diyar Bakr and the Levant	killed	1111/1112 or 1113 (Jumada al-Thani 492 AH)	Damascus, Emirate of Damascus	a fida'i	unknown	Both Sunni rulers Tughtigin and Ridwan may have been involved.
Ahmadil ibn Ibrahim al-Kurdi	emir of Maragheh	killed	1114 or 1116 (Muharram 510 AH)	in a large assembly in presence of Sultan Muhammad I	team of 3. 2 killed, the third's fate unknown (or Abd al-Malik Razi [عبدالملک رازی] or 4 Aleppine rafiqs)	knives	
Muntahi Alawi (منتهی علوی)	mufti of Jurjan	killed	494 AH		Hasan Daranbari (حسن دارانباری)		
Ahmad Sanjar	Seljuq sultan	threatened				knife	
al-Afdal Shahanshah	Fatimid vizier	killed	1121, December 13	Cairo, Fatimid Caliphate	team of 3 Aleppine rafiqs; fate unknown	knives	
Al-Amir bi-Ahkam Allah and Al-Ma'mun al-Bata'ihi	Fatimid caliph and his vizier	plot discovered		Cairo, Fatimid Caliphate			Directed from Alamut. Al-Amir was assassinated later (see below).
Kamal al-Mulk Abu Talib al-Simirumi	vizier of Seljuq Sultan Mahmud II	killed	1122	a procession in Baghdad, Seljuq Empire	team of 4; one escaped, others killed	knives	For pillaging the shrine of Ali.
Garshasaf Jurbadaqani (گرشاسف جربادقانی) (or Karshasb [کرشاسب])		killed	November–December 1121		a fida'i		
Unar (انر)	amir of Khurasan	killed	December 1121 - January 1122	Marw, Seljuk Empire	Abu al-Hayyan (ابو الحیان) or Isfandiyar Damawandi (اسفندیار دماوندی)		
Tughrul Mahalli(?) (طغرل محلی)	wali of Damghan	killed			Isfandiyar Damawandi (اسفندیار دماوندی)		
Abu Nasr Muhammad ibn Nasr ibn Mansur al-Harawi (آبو نصر محمد بن نصر بن منصور الهروي)	Hanafi qadi of Hamadan	killed	1125	Hamadan's mosque, Seljuq Empire	Muhammad Razi (محمد رازی) and Umar Damghani (عمر دامغانی)	unknown	
Ibn al-Khashshab	qadi and rais of Aleppo	killed	1125, at night	near his house in al-Zajjajin quarter, Aleppo, while leaving the Great Mosque	unknown	stabbed	After a massacre of the Nizaris.
Aqsunqur al-Bursuqi	atabeg of Aleppo	killed	1127 (or November 26, 1126)	Mosul's Great Mosque, Seljuq Empire	team of 10; fate unknown, he wounded 3	knives	
Mu'in al-Mulk Abu Nasr ibn Fazl	Seljuq vizier of Ahmad Sanjar	killed	1127, March 20	Seljuq Empire	his horseman, betrayed; fate unknown	unknown	
Mu'in al-Din al-Kashi (معین الدین مختص الملوک ابونصر احمد الکاشانی)	Seljuq vizier of Ahmad Sanjar	killed	1127, March 20 or 16 or Rabi' I 525 AH	Marw, Seljuq Empire, en route from the Sultan's palace to the mosque	by 2 fida'is who had gained his confidence (Muhammad Kuhaj [محمد کوهج] named)	knives	
Abd al-Latif al-Khujandi (عبد اللطيف الخجندي)	Shafi'i leader in Isfahan	killed	1129	Isfahan, Seljuk Empire	a fida'i	unknown	Killed by treachery.
Al-Amir bi-Ahkami'l-Lah	Fatimid Caliph in Cairo	killed	October 7, 1130	Cairo, Fatimid Caliphate	team of 7 rafiqs		
Sayyid Abu Hashim Zaydi	Zaydi Imam in Tabaristan	killed	Jamadi II 526 AH				
Taj al-Muluk Buri	atabeg of Damascus	died of wounds a year later	May 7, 1131 (died June 9, 1132)	Damascus, Emirate of Damascus (Syria)	two of his guards who were secretly fida'is probably from Alamut; both killed	knives, wounding him in two places	
Sayyid Dawlatshah Alawi (سید دولتشاه علوی)	prefect (either ra'is or naqib) of Isfahan	killed	Jamadi I 525 AH		Abu Abdallah Mughani (ابو عبدالله موغانی)		
Aqsunqur Ahmadili	governor of Maragha	killed	Dhil-Qa'da 525 AH		Ali (علی) and Abu Ubaydah Muhammad Dihistani (ابو عبیده محمد دهستانی)		
Shams Tabrizi	ra'is (prefect) of Tabriz	killed	Dhilhajja 525 AH		Abu Sa'id Qa'ini (ابو سعید قائنی) and ابو الحسن قرمانی or فراهانی		
Al-Mustarshid	Abbasid caliph	killed	1135 or 1134	in royal tentage at Maragheh's gates or near Hamadan, Seljuq Empire	team of 14 or 17 or 24; fled or killed by the guards	knives, stabbed many times	Some sources suspect that the Seljuq Sultan Mas'ud was involved. Some attendants were killed, too.
Hasan ibn Abi al-Qasim Karkhi (Karaji?) (حسن بن ابي القاسم كرخي)	mufti of Qazvin	killed	Dhilhajja 529 AH		Muhmmad Karkhi (Karaji?) (محمد کرخی) and Sulayman Qazwini (سليمان قزوینی)	knives, stabbed	
Al-Rashid	Abbasid caliph	killed	1135/1136 or June 1138	Mosul or Isfahan, Seljuq Empire	team of 2 or 4 (Balqāsim Darikī named) of Khurasanis in his service; fate unknown	knives, by stabbing	
Muqarrab al-Din Jawhar (مقرب الدين جوهر)	chamberlain, master of the Seljuq governor of Ray, Abbas	killed	1139/1140	Sultan Sanjar's camp in Marw	petitioners in women's garb	knives	Many Nizaris were killed in revenge by Abbas.
Girdbazu (گردبازو)	heir of Bavandid ruler Shah Ghazi Rustam	killed	1142	Sarakhs, Seljuq Empire			Many Nizaris were killed in revenge by Shah Ghazi Rustam.
Da'ud, son of Mahmud II	Seljuq sultan	killed	1143	Tabriz, Seljuq Empire	team of 4 Syrian 'rafiqs	ambushed	He had persecuted the Nizaris of Adharbayjan.
unnamed	vizier of Seljuq sultan Toghrul II	killed	unknown	unknown	unknown	knives, ambushed	
unnamed	mamluk lord of Masyaf	killed	unknown		team	unknown	Killed by treachery.
به اَموی	qadi of Quhistan	killed	1138/1139	Sultan Sanjar's camp	Ibrahim Hanafiyyah al-Damghani (إبراهيم حنفية الدامغاني); fate unknown	unknown	For authorizing the execution of Nizaris.
	qadi of Tiflis	killed	1138/1139		Ibrahim Buyah Damghani (ابراهیم بویه دامغانی)	unknown	For issuing fatwa regarding the execution of Nizaris.
Unnamed	qadi of Hamadan	killed	1139/1140	Hamadan's mosque, Seljuq Empire	Ismail al-Khwarazmi (إسمعيل الخوارزمي), several of whose companions had been killed and burned	unknown	For authorizing the execution of Nizaris.
Yamin al-Dawla Khwarazmshah (يمين الدولة خوارزمشاه) (Ayn al-Dawla?)	Seljuq vizier	killed	1139/1140	an army camp of Sultan Sanjar in Khwarezmia	unknown	unknown	
Nasir al-Dawla ibn al-Muhalhil (ناصر الدولة بن المهلهل)	Seljuq vizier	killed	1140/1141	Kerman, Seljuq Empire	al-Husayn al-Kirmani (الحسين الكرماني)	unknown	
Garshasaf	senior commander (emir; a ruler in Georgia)	killed	1143, June–July	unknown	a soldier	unknown	(Killed in action?)
Aqsunqur (آق سنقر)	mamluk of Sultan Sanjar and governor of Turshiz	killed	1146		team of 2 rafiqs: Sulayman and Yusuf	unknown	Killed as a rebel against the sultan.
Abbas (امیر پیر عباس)	shihna (governor) of Rayy	killed	1147	Ray or Baghdad, Seljuq Empire	unknown	unknown	Killed with armor on.
Raymond II	Count of Tripoli	killed	1152	Tripoli's southern city gate, County of Tripoli			Motivation uncertain. Killed along with two of his knights (including Ralph of Merle).
Saladin	Ayyubid sultan	mission failed	1175, May 11	Saladin's camp	13		
Saladin	Ayyubid sultan	threatened only	1176	near Masyaf Castle		knife	According to some traditions.
Adud al-Din Abu al-Faraj Muhmmad ibn Abdallah	vizier of the Abbasid caliph al-Mustadi	killed	1177/1178	leaving Baghdad for pilgrimage to Mecca	fida'is from Jabal al-Summaq, Syria		
Conrad of Montferrat	de facto King of Jerusalem	killed	1192, April 28	en route to his house in Acre, Kingdom of Jerusalem	team of 2; 1 killed, 1 captured	stabbed at least twice in the side and back	It is uncertain who actually instigated the attack; possibly Richard I of England, Humphrey IV of Toron, Henry II of Champagne or Saladin.
Muhammad of Ghor	Ghurid sultan	killed	1206, March 15	Dhamiak, near Sohawa, Ghurid Empire			One source attributes it to the Assassins.
Möngke Khan	Mongol khagan	plot or rumor	1253	Karakorum, Mongol Empire	team of 40+		Alleged mission ordered by Imam Ala' al-Din Muhammad.
Raymond, son of Bohemond IV of Antioch	heir to the throne of Antioch and Tripoli	killed	1213	outside the door of the Cathedral of Our Lady of Tortosa, Tortosa (Tartus), County of Tripoli			Bohemond IV unsuccessfully besieged Khawabi in response.
Adam of Baghras	Regent of Isabella, Queen of Armenia	killed	1220	Sis, Cilician Armenia			
Yamin al-Din Bahramshah ibn Harb (يمين الدين بهرامشاه بن حرب)	the Nasrid ruler of Sistan	killed		Zaranj, Sistan	4 fida'is dispatched from Quhistan		The Nasrid governor threatened to take by force the fortress Shahanshah near Nih that was sold to them by his brother Nasir al-Din Uthman.
Orkhan/Orghan	senior commander of Jalal al-Din Mangburni	killed		Ganja, Khwarezmian Empire	a team of petitioners; fled / 3 assassins, killed	concealed swords, stabbed	As a reprisal for raids against Quhistan.
Chagatai the Elder	Mongol noyan (commander)	killed	c.1249?			knife	Nizaris were massacred by his daughter Bulghan Khatun or his son Bulghan or Qara-Bulghan after the fall of the Nizari state.
Philip of Montfort	Lord of Tyre	killed	1270, March 17 or August 17	in his church in Tyre, Lordship of Tyre, Kingdom of Jerusalem	assassin disguised as a Christian; captured	dagger	
Ata-Malik Juvayni	Ilkhanate elite	survived	1270	Ilkhanate			Unsuccessful assassination attempt attributed to the Nizaris.
Lord Edward	Duke of Gascony	wounded	1271	Acre, Kingdom of Jerusalem	a Syrian Assassin; killed	dagger, possibly poisoned; struck in the arm	Supposedly by a Syrian Assassin under Baibars during the Ninth Crusade. The attempt failed as the assassin was overpowered and killed by Edward. Edward abandoned further campaigns afterwards.

== See also ==
- List of leaders of the Nizari–Seljuk conflicts
