= List of the Order of Assassins =

The order of Assassins was founded in Persia in 1090 by Hassan-i Sabbah. The list of Assassins associated with the order include the following:

- al-Hakim al-Munajjim, the physician-astrologer (d. 1103)
- Abu Tahir al-Sa’igh, the goldsmith (d. 1113)
- Bahram al-Da'i, nephew of al-Asterbadi (d. 1127)
- Rashid ad-Din Sinan (d. 1193)
- Sarim al-Din Mubarak, son-in-law of Baibars al-Bunduqdar, sultan of Egypt (fl. 1271)

== Others ==
- Dihdar Bu-Ali (fl. 1090)
- Mu'ayyad al-Din Muzaffar (fl. 1096)
- Sharaf al-Din Muhammad, son of Mu'ayyad al-Din Muzaffar (after 1096)
- Abu Ibrahim al-Asterbadi (d. 1101)
- Ahmad ibn 'Abd al-Malik ibn Attāsh (d. after 1105)
- Ismail al-'Ajami (d. 1130)
- Ali ibn-Wafa (d. 1149)
- Abu-Muhammad (fl. 1162)
- Khwaja Ali ibn Mas'ud (fl. 1162)
- Abu Mansur, nephew of Abu-Muhammad (fl. 1162)
- Nasr al-'Ajami (fl. 1193)
- Kamāl ad-Din al-Hasan (fl. after 1221)
- Majd ad-Din (d. after 1227)
- Sirāj ad-Din Muzaffa ibn al-Husain (fl. 1227–1238)
- Taj ad-Din Abu'l-Futūh ibn Muhammad (d. after 1249)
- Radi ad-Din Abu'l-Ma'āli (fl. 1256)
- Najm ad-Din (d. 1274)
- Shams al-Din, son of Najm ad-Din (fl. 1274).

Note that this list does not include the da'i and Imams that ruled the Nizari Isma'ili State from 1090 to 1255, beginning with Hassan-i Sabbah.

== See also ==
- List of Isma'ili missionaries
- List of Isma'ili imams
