= List of massacres of Nizari Ismailis =

Numerous massacres are recorded against the minority Nizari Ismaili Shia Muslims, particularly during the Alamut Period.

In many cases, the victims include non-Nizaris; such as supporters of the Nizaris, and people who are falsely accused and killed due to personal enmity.

The Nizari response was often the assassination of the leader behind the massacre.

== List ==
List of massacres of Nizaris
Date	Location	Perpetrator(s)	Deaths	Notable victims	Notes
1010–1025	Multan and al-Mansura, Sindh	Ghaznavids			Multiple massacres of Ismailis.
1093	Isfahan's city square, Seljuk Empire	local Sunni Muslims			All suspected Ismailis in the town were burned alive in the city center.
1101-	Seljuk Empire	Sultan Barkiyaruq		Muhammad ibn Dushmanziyar ibn Ala' al-Dawla (محمد بن دشمنزیار بن علاءالدوله), governor of Yazd; son of Kayqubad, commandant of Tikrit	As listed below.
1101	Isfahan's city square, Seljuk Empire	local Sunni Muslims, allowed by Barkiyaruq			
1101-	Baghdad and elsewhere in Iraq	ordered by Abbasid caliph al-Mustazhir		Abu Ibrahim Asadabadi (relative of Bahram al-Da'i)	Widespread massacres.
1113	Aleppo	Sa'id ibn Badi', ra'is of Aleppo and militia commander, approved by Alp Arslan al-Akhras during Muhammad I Tapar's anti-Nizari campaign	~200 massacred or imprisoned and their properties were confiscated	da'i Abu Tahir al-Sa'igh, da'i Isma'il, and a brother of da'i al-Hakim al-Munajjim	
1124	Amid, southern Armenia		~700		
1125	Aleppo	Ibn al-Khashshab			
September 1129	Damascus, Emirate of Damascus	Atabeg Taj al-Muluk Buri, the militia (al-ahdath) and the mob	6,000-10,000	Shadhili al-Kadim	
1138	Isfahan, Seljuk Empire				After the assassination of the Abbasid caliph al-Rashid Billah.
1140s	Seljuk Empire	Abbas (governor of Rayy)			After the assassination of Sultan Da'ud
1204	Lower Iraq				
May 1256	Tun (modern Ferdows), Nizari Ismaili state	Kitbuqa and Köke Ilgei	almost all inhabitants		
1257	Mongol Empire	Mongke Khan	~100,000		Multiple massacres, as listed below
1257	Toungat, Mongol Empire	Khurshah's Mongol guard (ordered by Mongke Khan)		Rukn al-Din Khurshah and his companions	
1257	between Qazvin and Abhar, Mongol Empire	Qaraqai Bitikchi (ordered by Mongke Khan)		Khurshah's relatives	
1257	Quhistan, Mongol Empire	Ötegü-China (ordered by Mongke Khan)	12,000		
1257?	Mongol Empire	Bulghan Khatun or Bulghan or Qara-Bulghan, the child of the assassinated Mongol commander Chagatai the Elder	200 or 300		
15 December 1270	Gerdkuh, Ilkhanate	Ilkhanate forces (during Abaqa Khan's reign)	the garrison of Gerdkuh		
1809	Eyalet of Acre, Ottoman Empire (present-day Syria)	Nusayris			
1392	Tabaristan, Timurid Empire	Timur's troops			
May 1393	Anjudan, Timurid Empire	Timur's troops			
1416	Daylam	Sayyid Radi Kiya of the Karkiya dynasty		Many Isma'ili leaders, including some descendants of the Imam Khudawand Ala al-Din Muhammad	

== See also ==
- Nizari–Seljuk wars
- List of assassinations by the Assassins
