= Kiya Buzurg-Ummid =

12th-century Isma'ili ruler of Alamut

- Title: Dāʿī

Personal life
- Born: 1062
- Died: 9 February 1138 (aged 75–76)
- Children: Muhammad ibn Kiya Buzurg Ummid; Kiya Ali
- Region: Iran
- Main interest(s): Islamic theology, Islamic jurisprudence
- Notable idea(s): Evolution, Oneness of God

Religious life
- Religion: Nizari Ismaili
- Jurisprudence: Nizari Ismaili Shi'ism

Senior posting
- Predecessor: Hassan-i Sabbah
- Successor: Muhammad ibn Buzurg-Ummid
- Influenced by: Hassan-i Sabbah
- Influenced: Muhammad ibn Kiya Buzurg Ummid

Kiyā Buzurg-Ummīd (Note: Transliteration based on Classical Persian, as the subject of the article lived in the 1100s. In modern Iranian Persian, this would be transliterated as some variation of Kiyâ Bozorg-Omid.) (Persian: کیا بزرگ‌امید; 1062 - February 1138) was a dāʿī and the second ruler (da'i) of the Nizari Isma'ili State, ruling Alamut Castle from 1124 to 1138 CE (or 518—532 AH). He was of Daylami origin from the region of Rudbar.

== Career ==
Prior to ruling the Nizari Isma'ilis, Buzurg Ummid captured Lambsar Castle for the Assassins and ruled it as commander for over twenty years.

Kiya Buzurg captured the Lambsar Castle from Rasamuj and rebuilt it into a major stronghold using local labour. He was appointed by Hasan Sabbah (d. 1124) as its governor.

=== As the ruler of Alamut ===
On 25 Rabīʿ II 518 (11 June 1124), a day before death of Ḥassan-i Ṣabbaḥ, Ḥassan appointed him his successor. He generally followed the policies of Ḥassan-i Ṣabbaḥ and enforced the Sharia strictly. In his early reign the Isma'ili hold was expanded in particular in Eshkevar and Taleghan.

As opposed to Hassan Sabbah, who is depicted as a revolutionary leader, the Ismaili sources depict Buzurg-Ummid as an administrator and a chivalrous lord (e.g. the story of him protecting his old enemy, emir Yaran-Qush Bazdar of Qazvin and his followers, who had fled to Alamut).

Another change in the Nizari government during his rule was the decrease in the number of assassinations; the list include the Abbasid caliph Al-Mustarshid, a prefect of Isfahan, a governor of Maragha, a prefect of Tabriz, and a mufti of Qazvin.

Kiya Buzurg Ummid died on 9 February 1138 and was succeeded by his son, Muhammad Buzurg Ummid, who was nominated as heir three days earlier.

== Works ==
The text of a bedtime prayer, titled "Prayer in Bedtime" (دعا در هنگام خواب du'ā dar hingām-i khwāb) in Persian attributed to Kiya Buzurg Ummid, is preserved in a manuscript of the Institute of Ismaili Studies in London.

== Notes ==
Regnal titles
Preceded by Hassan-i Sabbah; 1st Commander of Alamut Castle (1st Nizārī Ismā'īlī Da'i at Alamūt)	Kiyā Buzurg-Ummīd; 2nd Commander of Alamut Castle (2nd Nizārī Ismā'īlī Da'i at Alamūt); 1124–1138	Succeeded by Muḥammad ibn Kiyā Buzurg-Ummīd; 3rd Commander of Alamut Castle (3rd Nizārī Ismā'īlī Da'i at Alamūt)
