= Battle of Marj al-Saffar (1126) =

Battle in 1126

- Part of the Crusades
Date	January 26, 1126
Location	Marj al-Saffar, near Damascus, Seljuq Empire (Syria)
Result	Crusader victory

Belligerents
Kingdom of Jerusalem	Burids of Damascus; Nizari Ismailis of Syria

Commanders and leaders
Baldwin II of Jerusalem	Toghtekin of Damascus

Strength
Unknown	3000 Horsemen & Unknown amount of footmen (Fulcher's Account)

Casualties and losses
14 Knights & 80 footmen (Fulcher's Account)	2000 Horsemen & Unknown amount of footmen (Fulcher's Account)

The Battle of Marj al-Saffar was fought on January 25, 1126 between a Crusader army led by King Baldwin II of Jerusalem and the Seljuk Emirate of Damascus, which was ruled by Toghtekin. The Crusaders defeated the Muslim army in the field but failed in their objective to capture Damascus.

== Background ==
After winning the Battle of Azaz northeast of Antioch, Baldwin II led an army of Franks to attack Damascus in early 1126. Baldwin's army consisted of the usual mounted knights and men-at-arms supported by spearmen and bowmen on foot. At Marj al-Saffar, 30 kilometers outside Damascus, the Crusaders encountered the army of Damascus which offered battle. Toghtekin, founder of the Burid dynasty, ruled Damascus at that time.

== Battle ==
Only a few details are known about the battle. The sources are not in agreement about tactical details, but they concur that the Crusaders failed to seize Damascus. The Franks lost many men to Turkish archery in a very close-fought engagement. "But a strong attack made late in the day gave them a hard-won victory. Their tactical success left them unable to achieve their object in undertaking the campaign, which was the conquest of Damascus."

Another historian writes, "Crusader forces had a clear win but were unable to press home their advantage." A third writer notes that the Crusader victory occurred because Toghtekin "fell from his horse and, thinking that he had been killed, his companions fled." Because of their heavy casualties, the Crusaders were forced to retreat.

== Aftermath ==
Some Nizari Ismailis from Homs and elsewhere were involved in the defense of Damascus. This contributed to the establishment of the alliance between the Nizari leader Bahram al-Da'i, who was the Chief Da'i of Syria, and the Burids.

In 1129, the Franks attacked Damascus again, but their siege of the city was unsuccessful.
