= Abu Abdullah Ja'far ibn al-Aswad ibn al-Haytham =

10th-century Shia Islam Da'i

Abu Abdullah Ja'far ibn al-Aswad ibn al-Haytham was an Isma'ili da'i born in 268 AH (881/2 CE) in Qayrawan. He is the author of Kitāb al-Munāẓarāt ("The Book of discussions").
