= Abu Haatim Tayyib Ziyauddin =

Saiyedna wa Maulana Abu Haatim Taiyeb Ziyauddin Saheb
- Born: August 6, 1932
- Died: May 23, 2015 (aged 82)
- Known for: 44th Dā‘ī al-Muṭlaq
- Title: Ziyauddin
- Term: 1974–2015
- Predecessor: Saiyedna Yusuf Nooruddin Saheb
- Successor: Saiyedna Haatim Zakiyuddin Saheb
- Spouse: Mohtarema Maa Saheba 'Azeemabu binte Saiyedi wa Maulaai Bhaisaheb Nazarali
- Children: Sons: Maazun-ud-Da'wat Saiyedi wa Maulaai Hatim Zakiyuddin Saheb: Two Daughters and Three Sons - Mozaiyanah, Maymanah, Sa'eed ul-Khayr, Murtazaa, Mujtabaa Late Mukaasir-ud-Da'wat Husain Mo'inuddin Saheb: One Daughter and Two Sons - Mehleqaa, Saahil Husain, Qais 'Ali Mukaasir ud Dawat Mohammed Nuruddin Saheb: One Daughter and Two Sons - Kumail, Sudair, Zahraa Rasoolhudood Dr. Hakeemuddin Zulqarnain Saheb: Two Sons - Mehlam, Luqmaan
- Parent(s): Saiyedna Yusuf Nuruddin Saheb; Marhooma Maa Saheba Khadeejat ul-Kubra Mithibu binte Rajabali

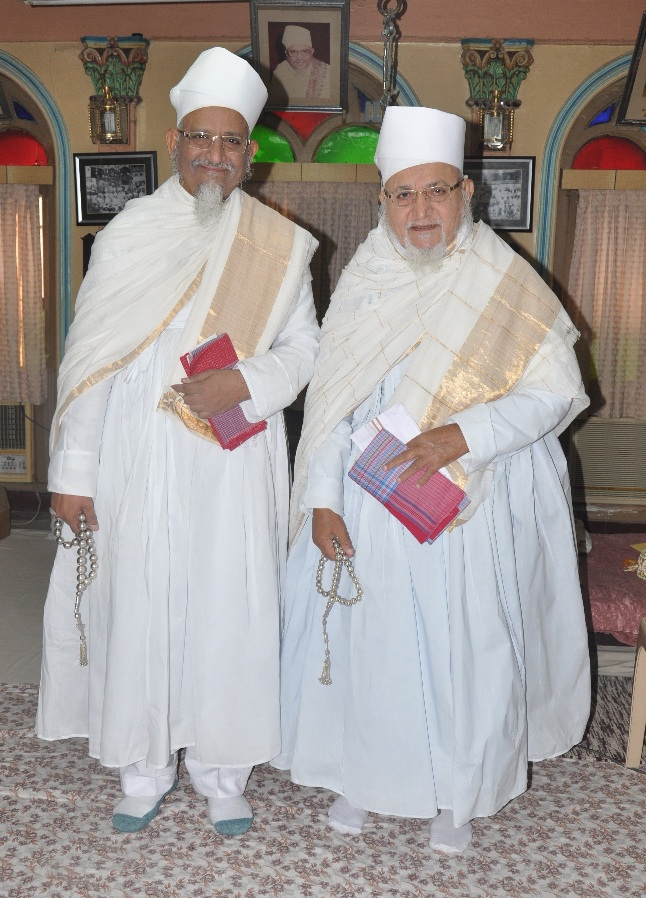
44th Da'i Saiyedna T Ziyauddin and 45th Da'i Saiyedna H Zakiyuddin at Devdi Mubaarak, Vadodara. Official Residence of a Da'i

Abu Hatim Ṭayyib Ziyā'u d-Dīn (August 6, 1932 – May 23, 2015), full name Saiyedna Abu Haatim Taiyeb Ziyauddin Saheb and personal name Taiyyeb, Ayyubali with kunya (agnomen) "Abu Haatim", was the 44th Dā‘ī al-Muṭlaq, "the absolute or unrestricted missionary", of the Alavi Bohra, a minority group of Ismā‘īlī Shī‘ah Muslims. Since he assumed the position in 1974, the Alavi Bohra community has progressed both locally and internationally in education, economic prosperity, religion, and in the awareness among its youth of the group's identity and religious roots.

Saiyedna saheb was born in 1932 to Saiyedna Yusuf Nuruddin Saheb (a.q.), the 43rd Da'i-e-Mutlaq, and Marhooma Maa Saheba Khadeejat ul-Kubra Mithibu binte Rajabali, and became Alavi Bohra's Da'i al-Mutlaq in 1974. His teacher was the 42nd Da'i-e-Mutlaq Saiyedna Fida'ali Badruddin Saheb. In 1975 (1395 AH), Abu Haatim performed the Hajj with 27 followers, the same number that was present with Sy. Shamsuddin Ali bin Ibrahim Shaheed (a.q.) in Ahmedabad during the mutiny by the usurper of Ahl-e-Motaghallib. He performed the Hajj again in 1992 (1412 AH), making him the only Da'i to date who has performed the Hajj twice. Throughout 2000, he visited Iraq, Shaam, Baitul Muqaddas, Misr, and Yaman in a comprehensive tour, making him the Zaair il-Mashhadain il-'Azeemain to do so. Additionally, despite health problems, Abu Haatim, accompanied by Karam-e-Rehmani and Roohani Taaeed from Imam uz-Zamaan, accomplished the Taiyebi Daur, the most difficult portion of safar-e-mubaarak, successfully.

On December 27, 1984, at Masjid-e-Noorani, Abu Haatim appointed Mazoon ud-Da'wat and Mansoos ud-Da'wat, the eldest son of Abu Haatim, at the fourth Rabi-ul-Aakhar. Abu Haatim's name Ṭayyib is derived from the name of the 21st Imam, Ṭayyib, who went into seclusion in 1130 as a result of the tyranny and oppression imposed by the other communities in Cairo when he was four years old. Abu Haatim lives in Daar us-Salaam, Vadodara. On May 23, 2015 Syedna Abu Hatim Tayyib Ziyauddin saheb died peacefully in Vadodara, Gujarat, India. He was succeeded in the post of Dai al Mutlaq by Saiyedna Abu Sa'eed il-Khayr Haatim Zakiyuddin saheb (tus) as the 45th Dai al Mutlaq of the Alavi Bohra.
