= Nizari Quhistani =

Iranian poet

Nizari Ghohestani
- حکیم سعدالدین بن شمس‌الدین نزاری بیرجندی قهستانی

Personal life
- Born: Birjand Khurasan, Iran
- Died: 1320
- Era: Kart dynasty; During Imam Shams al-Din Muhammad's Period
- Occupation: Poet; Author; Ismaili dāʿī; Scholar

Religious life
- Religion: Nizari Isma'ilism Shia Islam

Hakīm Sa'd-al-Dīn ibn Shams-al-Dīn Nizārī Bīrjandī Quhistānī (Persian: حکیم سعدالدین بن شمس‌الدین نزاری بیرجندی قهستانی), or simply Nizari Ghohestani (died 1320 CE), was a 13th-century Nizari Ismaili author and poet, who lived in the time of the Imam Shams al-Din (Nizari) Muhammad. Nizari was born into a family of landed gentry approximately a decade after the capitulation of the Alamut state and hailed from the town of Birjand. Nizari is the only Ismaili poet of this period whose works are extant. Nizari Quhistani’s work was quoted by many later Ismaili authors, such as the Persian Khwāja Muḥammad Riḍā b. Sulṭān Ḥusayn, also known as Khayrkhvah-i Harati.

== Life ==
Nizari completed his primary education in Birjand and Qa’in, and became adept in Arabic and Persian literature and philosophy. He received higher education at a college (madrasa), which he deplored as it was quite unlike the education he had received in his home town. For a time, he served as one of the only Ismaili officials at the court of Malik Shams-uddin Muhammad Kurt I (d. 1285 CE) better known as Shams al-Din Kart of the Kart dynasty in Herat. To serve the court was both a precious and precarious position for Nizari. In this role, Nizari toured Khurasan, Rayy, Sistan and Quhistan, eventually meeting the successor of the Imam Rukn al-Din Khwurshah, whom he identified as the Shah Shams. However, when an intimate of his was sentenced to death, Nizari could not hold his silence and after speaking out against the court, was discharged from his position. Nizari died in 1320 CE, approximately ten years after the death of the Imam Shams al-Din Muhammad.

Nizari Quhistani's pen name “Nizari” has been a topic of debate amongst scholars. Some historians including Mirkhwand, Khwandamir and Dawlatshah have suggested that the moniker implies Nizari's adherence to the Ismaili Imam Nizar. A second theory for Nizari's nom de plume is that he was of a slim (nizār) build, though this has been dismissed by the prominent scholar of Persian history E. G. Browne. However, even the theory of Nizari's allegiance to an Imam Nizar raises questions about the identity of such a figure. It is therefore unclear whether the name denotes Nizari's allegiance to the first Imam Nizar, that is Nizar b. al-Mustansirbillah, denoting him as a partisan of the Nizari branch of the Ismaili faith, or to the successor of the Imam Shams al-Din Muhammad who was known both as Imam Nizar and Imam Qasimshah. Shafique Virani observes that there were however no Mustaʽli Ismailis in the Persian-speaking territories and that it is therefore unlikely that the poet would distinguish himself from a branch virtually unknown in the region. Moreover, to identify oneself as such would draw attention to his religious persuasions, an altogether dangerous decision in the aftermath of the Mongol onslaught on the region.

== Works ==
Nizari Quhistani authored numerous poetic compositions, which earned him a place amongst notable Persian literary figures. The biographer Amin Ahmad Razi remarked in 1594 CE that Nizari's place in history was unaffected by his religious affiliation to the Ismaili faith. Similarly, in his famed Literary History of Persia, E. G. Browne compares Nizari's poetic prowess to that of the acclaimed Nasir-i Khusraw. Some of his poems are preserved in other works, such as the anonymous Ismaili work “Epistle of the Right Path” (Risāla-yi Ṣirāṭ al-Mustaqīm). The following is a list of Nizari's known extant works:

=== Dīwan ===
The dīwan (دیوان) of Nizari Quhistani is perhaps his largest written composition. This omnibus contains details of the workings da’wa and names various regions, presumably those in which there were Ismailis under the aegis of the hierarchy.

=== Safarnāma ===
In this poetic travelogue Nizari describes his journey undertaken in 1280 CE and encounters with individuals who, according to Nadia E. Jamal, may have been prominent Ismaili figures of Armenia, Arran, Azerbaijan and Georgia. It is in this work that Nizari indicates his meeting the successor of the Imam Rukn al-Din Khwurshah, Imam Shah Shams.

=== Munāẓara-yi Shab wa Rūz ===
The Munāẓara (Persian: مناظره شب و روز) of Nizari Quhistani characterises the debate between exoteric Islam, symbolised by the night, and the esoteric traditions, symbolised by the day. This short metaphorical poem is composed in mathnawi form.

=== Azhar wa Mazhar ===
This epic poem is a defense of the Ismaili faith, and is described by a Russian scholar of Nizari, Baiburdi, as embodying the ideals of Nizari. The hero of this poem, Mazhar, is the champion of esoteric Islam and represents the Ismaili faith, battling against Halil, who embodies the exoteric.
