= Haatim Zakiyuddin =

Indian Islamic leader (born 1959)

Haatim Zakiyuddin saheb 45th Da'i al-Mutlaq and Saiyedna of Alavi Bohra Muslim Community
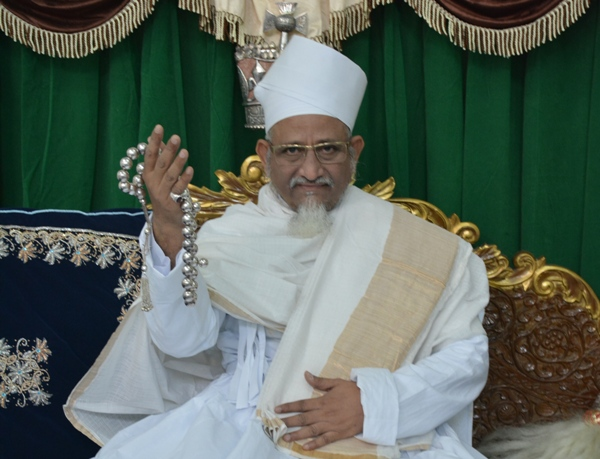
- Zakiyuddin in 2015
- Born: 10 September 1959 (age 67); Vadodara, Gujarat, India
- Citizenship: Indian
- Education: University of Bombay (MA)
- Organization: ad-Da'wat ul-Haadiyah il-'Alaviyah
- Title: Aqaa Maulaa, Saiyedna saheb
- Term: From 23-05-2015
- Predecessor: Abu Haatim Taiyeb Ziyauddin, 44th Da'i al-Mutlaq
- Successor: His eldest son, Ma'zoon ud Da'wat Saiyedi Sa'eed ul Khayr Bhaisaheb 'Imaaduddin
- Spouse: al-Mo'azzamah al-Mohtaramah Husbaanah bu
- Children: 3 sons: Sa'eed ul-Khayr, Murtazaa, Mujtabaa 2 daughters: Mozaiyanah, Maymanah
- Website: alavibohra.org

Saiyeduna Haatim Zakiyuddin (Arabic: حاتم زکي الدین) (born 10 September 1959), is the 45th Saiyedna and Da'i al-Mutlaq of Alavi Bohras and Naa'ib (نائب) representative, vicar, legatee and deputy of the progeny of 21st Fatimid Isma'ili Imam Abul Qaasim at-Taiyeb during the time of his Concealment from Cairo in 528 AH/1132 AD which is called Daur us Satr (دور الستر). He is of the noble rank of Da'i al-Mutlaq or ad-Da'i ul-Mutlaq or Da'i-e-Mutlaq enjoying absolute spiritual and temporal authority under the secreted guidance (تأئید) of the Imam of Time (إمام الزمان). Anyone who gives him Oath of Allegiance and Covenant (بیعت، میثاق) on the name of Imam at-Taiyeb, then only he is regarded the member of Alavi Bohra Community. The chief jurist an-No'maan of the Fatimid court of Imam Mo'iz says in his work that, As for the true followers, the members of the Ismaili community, they faithfully take the pledge of allegiance to the Imam.

The present Da'i or Saiyedna is the 11th Saheb of Baite Ziyavi.

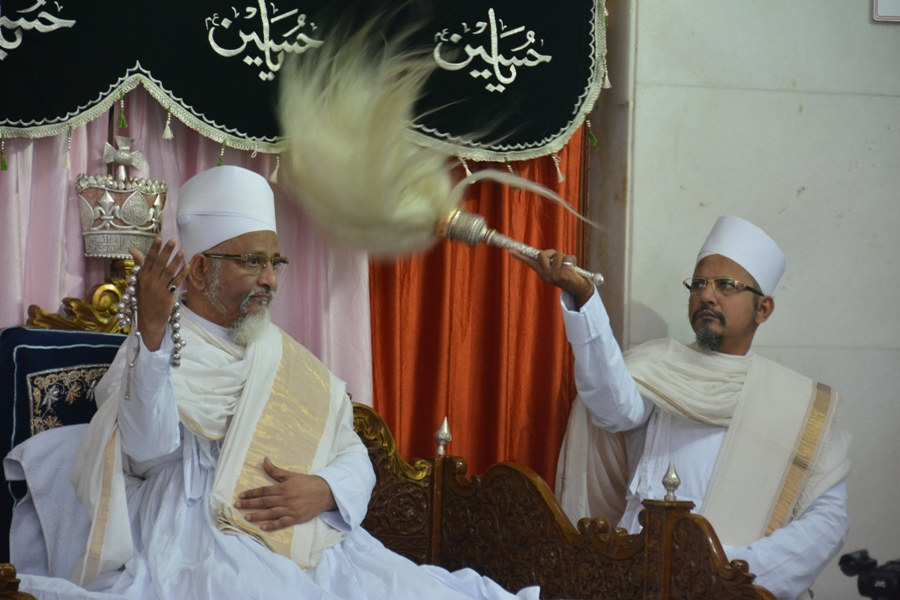
Aqaa Maulaa Saiyedna Haatim Zakiyuddin saheb on Takht e Taiyebi

== Introduction, mission (Da'wat) and community ==
The present 45th Da’i-e-Mutlaq or Da'i uz-Zamaan (the da'i of the present time) i.e. the representative (naa'ib) of Imaam uz-Zamaan (the imaam in the progeny of Imaam Taiyeb), Haatim ul-Khayraat, Rabi' ul-Barakaat Saiyedna Abu Sa'eed il-Khayr Haatim Zakiyuddin Saheb (tus) has continued his predecessor's endeavors with particular emphasis on strengthening the community's relationship with other community leadership and by following Islamic practices by promoting and spreading awareness about the Fatimid identity and Isma'ili legacy.

His birthplace is Badri Mohalla, Vadodara, his birth date falls on 8th Rabi' ul-Awwal 1379 AH/10 September 1959 AD, Thursday. Under the graceful hands of his grandfather, the 43rd Da'i ul Mutlaq Saiyedna Yusuf Nuruddin saheb (d. 1394 AH) and Mukaasir ud Da'wat Bhaisaheb Nazarali (d. 1397 AH), he completed his formal religious education and then took special sessions of 'Uloom e Da'wat. For graduation and post-graduation he stayed in Mumbai for 5 years (1979-1984 AD) studying Arabic Language and Literature with Islamic Studies in Mumbai University. During his stay in Mumbai, he did all things possible to enrich the library of Da'wah Shareefah by acquiring Isma'ili-Taiyebi MSS and rare Islamic books. He is instrumental in collating rare manuscripts and make it an integral part of Alavi khizana. He did tarbiyat and Taiyebi upbringing of Mumbai mumineen on the morals of Ahl ul Bayt (as) by fulfilling the responsibilities of Moharram and Shahrullaah.

During the Da’iship of his father, the 44th Da'i, Saiyedna Taiyeb Ziyauddin saheb, he being Ma’zoon, (a spiritual status after da’i) from 1984 AD, he shouldered the responsibility of educating people for the betterment of the community. Now that he is on a status of Da’i al-Mutlaq from 2015 AD, he sees to it that the 'Ilmi, Commerce and Social relations with other community members are maintained. In 1423 AH/2011 AD he sent his eldest son Bhaisaheb Sa’eed ul-Khayr, who would be elevated to the status of Mazoon e Mutlaq, to Qumm, Iran for graduation in Arabic Language and Literature. It is for the time that anyone from Qasr-e-‘Aali has traveled to the land of Iran for higher studies. It is the holy land of Du'aat who migrated to Egypt in the service of Fatimid (Faatemi) Imaam during 4th and 5th century AH. Knowing the importance of Education and this being the foundation of Da’wat e Haqq (divine mission), Saiyedna saheb took personal interest in educating and specializing the Abnaa (children) of Da’wat in various fields.

At present Saiyedna saheb's eldest son Sa'eed ul Khayr Bhaisaheb 'Imaaduddin saheb DM is Mazoon al-Mutlaq as well as Mansoos who was elevated on 4th Rabi' ul Aakhar 1442 AH/19 Nov 2020 AD. Saiyedna saheb's younger brother, Mohammad Bhaisaheb Nuruddin saheb DM is on the status of Mukaasir al-Mutlaq since 7th Rajab 1430 AH/29 June 2009 AD after the demise of Mukaasir al-Mutlaq Dr. Husain Mo’eenuddin on 13th Shawwaal 1429 AH/12 October 2008 AD. The status of Ra's ul-Hudood is headed by his youngest brother Dr. Zulqarnain Bhaisaheb Hakeemuddin who was assigned this responsibility along with Mukaasir al-Mutlaq. When Saiyedna saheb did Nass-e-jali and appointed-declared his eldest son as his successor 46th Da'i al-Mutlaq, Mukaasir al-Mutlaq was awarded a unique laqab as "Siqat ud-Da'wat il-Haadiyat il-'Alaviyah" (ثقۃ الدعوۃ الهادیۃ العلویۃ, SDHA) meaning the most trusted, and Ra's ul-Hudood was awarded a special laqab as "Naasir ud-Da'wat it-Taiyebiyah" (ناصر الدعوۃ الطیبیۃ, NDT) meaning one who assist in Da'wah affairs.

He played a pivotal role in revamping the syllabus of Madrasah Taiyebiyah by making the learning of Lisaan ud-da’wat compulsory for all pupils. He is always there to guide and give special inserts in publishing a number of books highlighting Alavi faith and practices. The time when the website was conceptualized in 1425 AH/2004 AD along with bi-monthly deeni newsletter "Mishkaat ul-Haadi", he took a forefront in vitalizing and providing subject matter as per the demand of time. Keeping pace with changing times and the World of Mobile Information, he envisioned the way to reach to the farest and smallest member of the community, by developing the Mobile App "Ahl uz Zikr". He eased the matrimonial related complications by making al-Vezaarat ul-'Alaviyah (the office of ad-Da’wat ul-Haadiyah) the centre of all these activities, promoted youth activities, women welfare, medical centers and camps, educational skills for teachers, higher education, literacy, trade and business etc.

He offered Hajj e Tamatto’-Pilgrimage to Makkah-Madinah along with his beloved father 44th Da’i in 1412 AH/1992 AD with the group of 82 believers. It is after this Hajj, he compiled the book consisting of the Hajj arkaan and its manaasik. He himself took special sessions and prepared mumineen for how to perform proper and perfect Hajj. In 1420 AH/1999 AD, Saiyedna saheb with 44th Da’i, undertook long journey of 42 days for Ziyaaraat e Mubaarakah in Iraq, Jordan, Egypt, Israel, Syria and Yemen. It is due to his efforts and encouragement, many more people are opting to go for the Ziyaarat in Karbalaa and Najaf instead of wasting money at some other tourists destinations. Extensive Sabaq with literature has been arranged for the people going for ‘Umrah Mufradah that has increased manifold by every passing year.

For every small or big spiritual or social occasion, printed literature is furnished by Saiyedna saheb's office giving appropriate instructions to the applicants. 24 Hudood (person with specifically assigned task) are there to perform the religious ceremonies as per guidelines defined since centuries and on Taiyebi Tenets. Be it at Devdi Mubaarak – Residence of Saiyedna saheb, masjid, community hall, private majlis, graveyard for the occasions pertaining to inauguration, sehra, birthday, marriage, misaaq (divine oath), roza-iftaari, ziyaafat, khatnah or deceased person's sadaqallaah. Saiyedna saheb and his close associates manages all these affairs. This is the reason that Devdi Mubaarak is abuzz every time with the spiritual proceeding of believers.

He has retained the amount of mehr of Rs. 1000/- fixed by his father al-Maulaa al-Muqaddas, which was previously Rs. 200/- during the time of 41st Da'i, for the marriage proposal given to the bride and it is on a discretionary power of an individual to give or not to give anything apart from mehr. There is no concept of dowry and one is free to arrange anything for the marriage of her daughter as per his financial condition, but under the pre-defined religious laws. His tenure as a Mazoon and now as a Da'i is marked by the constructions of new mosques, guest houses (musaafir-khaanas), mausoleums and community halls. His acumen in Fatimid architecture could be seen in the building constructed under his supervision. This has earned him an able designer and future planner as far as the space utility is concerned. Masjid-e-Faatemi, Masjid-e-Haatemi, Masjid-e-Shehaabi, Masjid-e-Bardi, Mazaar of Saiyedna Ameeruddin saheb in Pratapnagar, Saiyedna Nuruddin saheb in Wadi, Saiyedna Badruddin saheb in Bustaan e Badri are the master-pieces of his expertise.

The concept of pre-wedding religious counselling and personal consultation was initiated some years back and now, one can find positive results out of it as the instances of marital discord and divorces has considerably decreased. In the majlis known as Dhaaru-Fixing of the date of marriage and the day when wedding cards are distributed in the community, the to be-couple sits in front of Saiyedna saheb and he himself explains the realities of married life, its responsibilities and sacrifices. Likewise by the Razaa-permission of Saiyedna saheb, the training sessions of the Baaligh children-the children who has attained the age of puberty and has to give to Saiyedna saheb the Oath of Loyalty (Misaaq) which is meant for the Imaam of the time from the progeny of Mohammad known as "Imaam uz Zamaan (as)", is regularly conducted before the majlis of Misaaq. The children are educated with the pillars of Islam and faith, their responsibilities of being an Alavi Bohra, their obligatory deeds as per the Canonical Law of Islam from dawn to dusk, their relationship with their family members, relatives, neighbours, employees and community members. One who gives misaaq enjoys all the spiritual attachments and absolute guidance from Saiyedna saheb. This gives him the identity of being an Alavi.

During the turbulent time of the pandemic and the fear of the infection of Corona virus (COVID-19) worldwide, there was a global lockdown and economical slowdown. In every nook and corner of the world people were confined to their homes for months together and a new normal was initiated to Work from Home. This all started in Rajab 1441 AH/March 2020 AD when it started spreading in almost all the countries. All social and religious gatherings were restricted and rescheduled. During this time in Shahrullaah 1441 AH and Moharram 1442 AH, all the prayers, majaalis, wa’az and du’aas were broadcast, or pre-recorded, at Devdi Mubaarak. Then through Zoom and YouTube it was made available to mumineen. It was Saiyedna saheb's willingness and guidance to keep pace with the demanding time, this facility could be made possible.

Publications meant for religious knowledge and awareness (deeni ma’lumaat) is his prime objective. Knowing that the books are the mother of development and discipline, he always emphasized in reading good things for fruitful results. Several books highlighting Isma’ili-Taiyebi faith and facts were published to make his followers make aware of their religious and social duties. Books such as:

- کتاب الولایۃ، دعائم الاسلام - Kitaab ul-Walaayah from Da'aaim ul-Islaam - how sincerity is incumbent on a follower for his imaam,
- مخزن المسائل - Makhzan ul-Masaa’il - 363 Q&A relating to wide range of topics strengthening the knowledge of a beginner,
- لسان الدعوۃ - Lisaan ud-Da’wat – 3 books for learning the language of Da’wat in detail,
- منسک - Mansak – 2 books guiding a pilgrim for Hajj and ‘Umrah,
- صلوۃ نصف اللیل - Salaat-o-Nisf il-Layl – different night prayers with translation,
- انوار القرآن - Anwaar ul-Qur’an – different chapters of Qur’an with translation,
- صحیفۃ شھر اللہ - Shahrullaah Saheefah – containing detailed account of Ramazaan and its aamaal-o-arkaan,
- المصباح - Misbaah – consisting of all the supplications (du’aas) with translation which an Alavi Bohra recites from dawn to dusk,
- الصحیفۃ الطیبیۃ - Saheefah Taiyebiyah – comprehensive account of each and every aspect of religious obligations of an Alavi,
- اصحاب الیمین - Ashaab ul-Yameen - History of 24 Yemeni Missionaries (du'aat) with their works and lectures
- ادعیۃ الصلوۃ و الوضؤ - Ad’eeyat us-Salaat wal Wuzu – meant for the students of Madrasah Taiyebiyah,
- منسک کربلاء و النجف - Mansak of Karbalaa-Najaf - book containing supplications and instructions for the one who intends to go for Ziyaarat of Maulaa 'Ali and Maulaa Husain (as)
- كتاب الوصایا - Kitaab ul Wasaaya - precepts of Faatemi A'immat Taahereen AS compiled from the book Da'aaim ul Islaam.

== Literary works in manuscripts ==
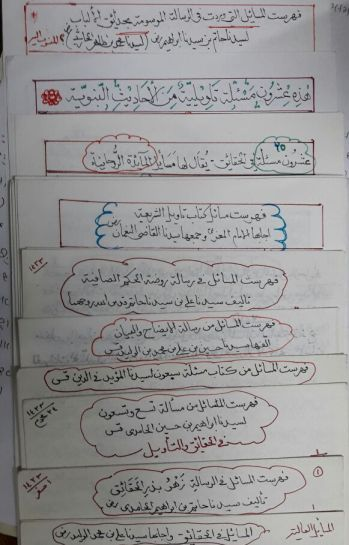
A MSS on the List of Realities of Isma'ili-Taiyebi Faith

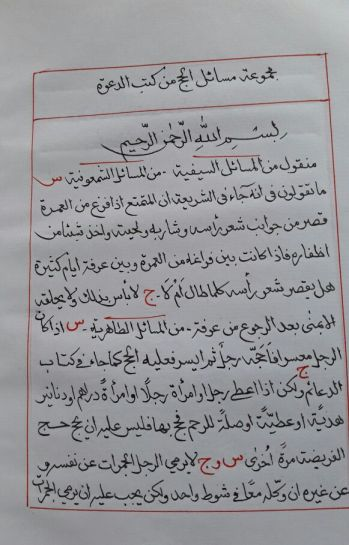
A Manuscript having various Q&A on the Hajj Pilgrimage

- "Majmu'ah Bayaan-e-Manaasik il-Hajj min Kotob id-Da'wah" - مجموعۃ بیان المناسک الحج من کتب الدعوۃ : Year 1420 AH/1999 AD - In a single book Maulaa has collected all the lectures, chapters and epistles from almost all Books of Da'wah Shareefah relating to the Arkaan (pillars) and Manaasik of Hajj, its evident-ظاھر as well as hidden-باطن meaning, its compulsory and voluntary actions, its various aspects and ways to deal with the situation in case of big and small mistakes, rules of Tawaaf-طواف i.e. 7 circumambulations of Ka'bah and Safaa-Marwah.
- "Diwaan-e-Haatim" - دیوان حاتم : Year 1425 AH/2004 AD - Saiyedna saheb's collection of Ash'aar-اشعار i.e. poetic composition in form of Bayt (couplets), Qasaa'id (eulogy), Ash'aar in Band-بند recited in the Majlis held during the last of Ramadan-رمضان namely Roti (chapati), Awrat (woman), Aadmi (man), 'Ilm (knowledge), Ne'mat (bounties) etc., Rubaa'iyaat-رباعیات, Qata'aat-قطعات etc. Till date different types of composition are added.
- "Majmu'at ul-Masaa'il fi 'Ilm il-Haqaa'iq wat Ta'weelaat wa Rusoomaat id-Da'wah" - مجموعۃ المسائل فی علم الحقائق و التأویلات و رسومات الدعوۃ : Year 1422 AH/2001 AD - This MSS contains various types of Questions and its Answers based on the Esoteric meaning of Islam, the pillars of Faith, Qisas ul-Ambiyaa-the Stories of Prophets with relation to the Household of Mohammad, Life after Death, the Day of Judgement, the Reward and Punishment of various deeds and accordingly the place in Paradise and Hell, the Creation of this World, the origin and return of all creatures etc.
- "Fihrist ul-Masaa'il it-Ta'weeliyah wa fi 'Ilm il-Haqeeqah min Kotob id-Da'wah" - فھرست المسائل التأویلیۃ و فی علم الحقیقۃ من کتب الدعوۃ : Year 1423 AH/2002 AD - It is highly important piece of Isma'ili Taiyebi Literature in which one can find the complete list of Questions pertaining to the Esoteric and Hidden meaning and interpretation of Shari'ah covering the Fatimid as well as post Fatimid Yemeni phase of Da'wah. It deals with the questions answered by Saiyedna Hatim, Imam Mo'iz, Saiyedna Ali bin Saiyedna Hatim, Saiyedna Husain bin Ali bin Mohammad al-Waleed, Saiyedna Mo'ayyad ash-Shirazi, Saiyedna Ibraahim bin Husain etc.
- "Mulaahezaat fi Zaw'e it-Ta'weel minal Aayaat il-Qur'aniyah" - ملاحظات فی ضوء التأویل من الآیات القرآنیۃ : Year 1427 AH/2006 AD - This personal copy of Qur'an e Kareem presents a deep insight and vast study of the works of both Du'aat al-Balaagh and Du'aat al-Mutlaqeen spanning from the 3rd century to 10th century AH. Each and every page is dotted and marked by specific comments, notes and hints which gives a reader a vivid and spectacular outlook of how Isma'ili-Taiyebi authors takes certain Qur'anic verses or words to a limitless scope of Esoteric Interpretation.
- "al-Qaraatees ul-Haatimiyah lil Bayaanaat il-Mukhtalefah wan Nikaat il-'Ilmiyah wat Tawjeehaat wal Muqaabelaat min Kotob id-Da'wah" - القراطیس الحاتمیۃ للبیانات المختلفۃ و النکات العلمیۃ و التوجیھات و المقابلات من کتب الدعوۃ : Year 1405 AH/1985 AD - Nearly 3000 Awraaq-pages in the form of MSS is meticulously preserved and used till date. These beautifully calligraphed documents are based on the large number of works and books authored by the Isma'ili Taiyebi Missionaries in Cairo, Yemen and Ahmedabad. Which in turn are based on Qur'anic Teachings, Prophetic Traditions, Quotations and Sermons of Ahl ul Bayt and Fatimid Imams etc. The اوراق-documents are widely used by the close associates of the Da'i to deliver lectures and sermons in various mosques and on various religio-social occasions. As per its subject matter it is categorized and sectioned in wide range of topics encompassing various Isma'ili Sciences and Faculties.

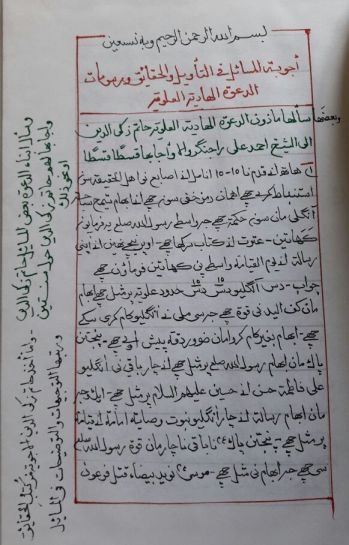
A Manuscript covering the Q&A on the Esoteric meaning and traditions in Shari'ah

- "Khulaasat ul-Masaa'il" - خلاصۃ المسائل : Year 1411 AH/1991 AD - This is the book consisting of different questions asked frequently by a beginner in Isma'ili-Taiyebi faith. Every question is dealt with very simple language and answered to the point easily understood by a reader. The questions pertains to Prophets and their Qur'anic narrations, Isma'ili-Taiyebi Jurisprudence, Customs and Practices, Pillars of Islaam and Imaan, History of Faatemi A'immat and Du'aat, Realities of Worldly life and the Hereafter etc. It has 136 Q&A and lastly it has the Wasiyat of Mohammad to the Commander of Faithful Maulaa 'Ali.

== Notes and references ==
Preceded by Abu Haatim Tayyib Ziyauddin	45th Dā'ī al-Mutlaq of the Alavi Bohras; 2015 - present	Succeeded by incumbent
