= Muhammad ibn Buzurg-Ummid =

Muḥammad ibn Buzurg-Ummīd (Persian: محمد بن بزرگ امید; died February 20, 1162) was the son of Kiyā Buzurg-Ummīd, and the third ruler of the Nizari Ismailis from 1138 until 1162 based in Alamut.

== Career ==
Upon the demise of Kiyā Buzurg-Ummīd on February 9, 1138, he was appointed as the commander of Alamut Castle by the third concealed Imam Hasan Al-Qāhir ibn Al-Muḥammad (القاهر) of the Nizārī Ismā'īlī state. He died in 1162 and was succeeded by his son Hassan as dai. Some, including authoritative (though biased) historian Joveyni, claim that it was his son who declared himself imam as Hasan ‘Alā Dhīkr‘īhī's-Salām, de facto usurping the Nizari Imamate. Nizari sources generally claim that the two individuals are distinct.

== Succession ==
Regnal titles
Preceded by Kiyā Buzurg-Ummīd; 2nd Commander of Alamut Castle (2nd Nizārī Ismā'īlī Da'i at Alamūt)	Muḥammad ibn Kiyā Buzurg-Ummīd; 3rd Commander of Alamut Castle (3rd Nizārī Ismā'īlī Da'i at Alamūt); 1138–1159	Succeeded by Hassan Ala Dhikrihi's Salam; 4th Commander of Alamut Castle (23rd Nizārī Ismā'īlī Imām at Alamūt)
