= Bahram al-Da'i =

- بهرام الداعي
- Born: Astarabad, Persia
- Citizenship: Nizari Ismaili state Emirate of Damascus
- Occupation(s): Missionary, military leader
- Predecessor: Abu Tahir al-Sa'igh
- Successor: Isma'il al-Ajami

Bahram al-Da'i (Arabic: بهرام الداعي, "Bahram the da'i [missionary]") or Bahram of Astarabad was a 12th-century Persian Nizari Ismaili who was the Chief Da'i and leader of the Assassins in Syria from after 1113 through 1128. Although his attempt to establish a Nizari base in Damascus was unsuccessful, he had an important role in organizing Nizari presence in Northern and Southern Syria.

== Career ==
Bahram was a nephew of a Nizari Isma'ili leader named Abu Ibrahim Asadabadi who was executed in Baghdad in midst of the massacres ordered by Seljuk sultan Barkiyaruq in 1101. Asadabadi had been an envoy of Barkiyaruq's.

After the execution of his predecessor Abu Tahir al-Sa'igh and the uprooting of the Nizaris in Aleppo, Bahram was sent by Alamut Castle in an attempt to expand the Nizari base in Syria.

According to Ibn al-Qalanisi, the main source of Isma'ili presence in Damascus, Bahram started his career as a propagandist throughout of Syria, living in secrecy.

Nizari power in Aleppo began to decline as the Artuqid prince Belek Ghazi captured the city in 1123, who expelled the sect from the city in 1124.

Bahram turned to Southern Syria as recommended by his supporter Ilghazi, the Artukid prince of Mardin. Bahram tried to establish a base in Damascus which was then under the rule of the Burid ruler Toghtekin. At this time in 1125, Damascus was under threats of the Frankish Crusaders under Baldwin II of Jerusalem, and Isma'ilis from Homs and elsewhere had joined Toghtekin's troops in the Battle of Marj al-Saffar against the Franks in 1126. Toghtekin thus welcomed Bahram. Abu Ali Tahir ibn Sa'id al-Mazadaqani (المزدقاني), the chief vizier of Toghtekin, was partial to the Nizaris, and persuaded Toghtekin to give a Mission House (dar al-da'wah) in Damascus and the frontier stronghold of Banias to Bahram, who refortified the stronghold and made it his base, performing extensive raids from there and possibly capturing more places. By 1128, their activities had become so formidable that "nobody dared to say a word about it openly", as described by Ibn al-Qalanisi. Toghtekin thus became anxious about his relations with Bahram. According to Ibn al-Qalanisi, al-Mazdaqani was to blame, while Ibn al-Athir claims Toghtekin was responsible for the situation.

=== Death ===
Bahram was killed in action in Wadi al-Taym on the western slopes of Mount Hermon while fighting local tribes in 1128. Isma'ili presence in Damascus began to decline after his death. He was succeeded by Isma'il al-Ajami, another Persian da'i.
