= Great Mosque of al-Nuri, Homs =

Mosque in Homs, Syria

Great Mosque of al-Nuri
- ٱلْجَامِع ٱلنُّورِي ٱلْكَبِير
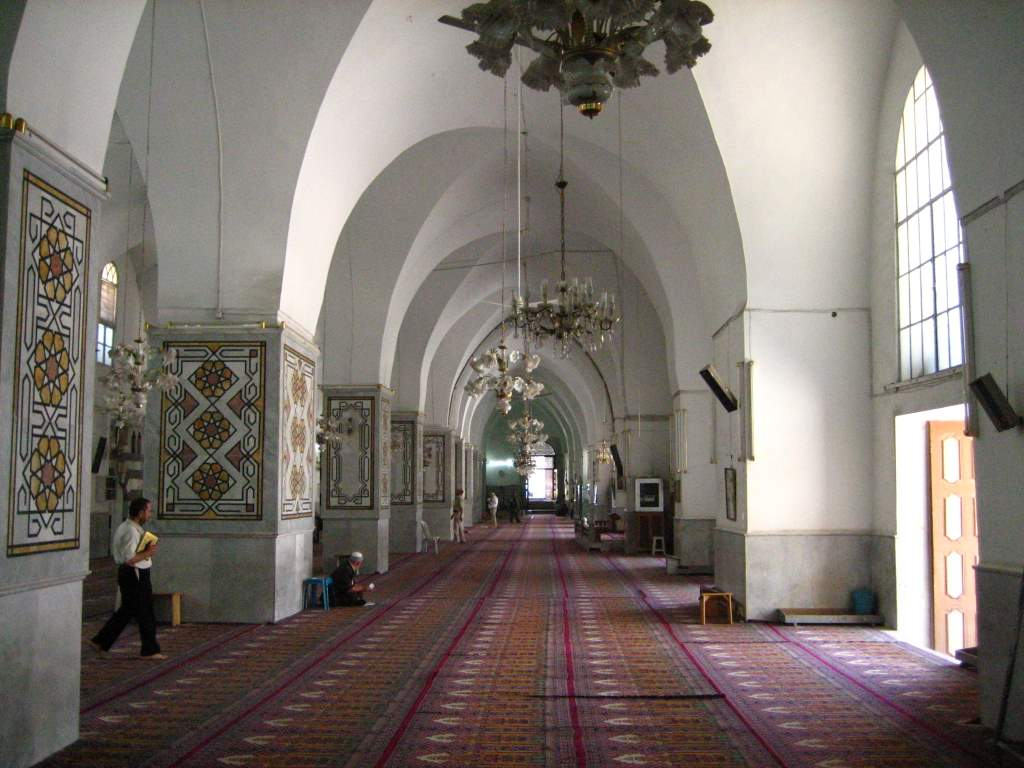
- The interior of the mosque

- Location of the mosque in Syria

Religion
- Affiliation: Sunni Islam
- Ecclesiastical or organizational status: Mosque
- Status: Active

Location
- Location: Homs
- Country: Syria
- Interactive map of Great Mosque of al-Nuri
- Coordinates: 34°43′51″N 36°42′53″E

Architecture
- Type: Mosque
- Completed: 1129 CE

The Great Mosque of al-Nuri (Arabic: ٱلْجَامِع ٱلنُّورِي ٱلْكَبِير, romanized: al-Jāmiʿ an-Nūrī al-Kabīr) also called al-Nouri Mosque, is a mosque in Homs, Syria. It is situated off ash-Shouhada street, adjacent to the city's historical roofed souqs ("markets").

== History ==
Originally, under the Roman Empire, the Great Mosque was the site of the city's pagan temple for the sun god ("El-Gabal"). The temple gained Emesa (Homs) prominence in the region as an important center of paganism and one of its priests, Elagabalus, became Emperor of Rome. El-Gabal's temple was paid tribute by Aurelian after he attributed his victory of Zenobia to the deity.

Later during the Byzantine phase of the Empire, the temple was converted into a church dedicated to Saint John the Baptist during the reign of Theodosius I as part of Christian persecution of paganism. After the city was conquered by the Muslims, one-fourth or half of the church was transformed into the Friday Mosque (Jama'a Masjid) of Homs. According to numerous Muslim geographers who visited the city throughout the centuries of Islamic rule, a talisman made of white stone stood over the gate of the mosque facing the church. It depicted an image of a man whose lower body was that of a scorpion, and local tradition claimed that if a man was stung by a scorpion, he should take clay, press it on the image, then dissolve the clay in water and drink it. Afterward, pain from the sting would cease and he would quickly recover.

In October 968, the Byzantines led by Nikephoros II Phokas who sacked the city of Homs, managed to briefly restore it as a church.

In 1154, Muslim geographer al-Idrisi wrote that the mosque was "one of the largest of all the cities of Syria". During the reign of Nur ad-Din the Zengid sultan, between 1146 and 1174, much of the modern structure was built and thus the name "al-Nuri" was attributed to him. The Great Mosque has since undergone extensive modifications over the centuries.

== Archaeology ==
In February 2026, a newly analyzed Greek inscription provided evidence for the location of the long-lost Temple of the Sun, once home to the solar cult of the Roman emperor Elagabalus. Carved into a granite column base beneath the mosque’s floor, the Greek text describes a ruler with "heroic and militaristic" imagery, comparing him to the wind and a leopard. While found during 2016 restoration work, full academic analysis was delayed until recently due to instability in the region. Published in the journal Shedet, the study suggests that the sacred space was preserved through architectural "superimposition" rather than destruction, with the pagan temple's stones forming the foundation for later structures.

== Architecture ==
The body structure of the Great Mosque of al-Nuri is large and rectangular and inside the mosque is courtyard of the same shape. The courtyard includes a raised terrace along the wall, possibly representing a part of the podium on which the cella of the pagan temple would have stood. Other independent structures in the courtyard include a heavily decorated basalt basin, perhaps being an old sarcophagus. Columns with Corinthian capitals line the wall, some of which are clearly of Roman origin. The mihrab ("pulpit") of the mosque contains remnants of mosaics in its arch. The main entrance to the mosque is arched, decorated with black and white stone, and carved with Arabic inscriptions on either side.

== See also ==
- Islam in Syria
- List of mosques in Syria
