= Abu'l Fath of Sarmin =

Abu’l Fath of Sarmin was a Nizari Ismaili missionary (da'i) and qadi from Sarmin, Seljuk Empire. He enlisted help from Ridwan and fellow Assassin Abu Tahir al-Sa'igh to assassinate Khalaf ibn Mula’ib in 1106, after which he became emir of the Assassin castle Qalaat al-Madiq in Apamea. He also enlisted Ridwan to counter the threat from Tancred. Tancred, with help from Khalaf’s son Musbih ibn Mula’ib, captured the town. Abu’l Fath, without allies among the neighboring emirs, negotiated the safe passage of the Muslims in the town. Nevertheless, he and three of his followers were put to death. Apamean nobles were then taken to Antioch to be ransomed by Ridwan.
