= Janah ad-Dawla =

Arab Seljuq emir of Homs (d. 1103)

- Died: 1103; Homs
- Citizenship: Arab Seljuq
- Occupation: Emir
- Known for: Atabeg of Ridwan
- Office: Emir of Homs

Map of the Levant in 1097 AD, at the arrival of the 1st Crusade, showing areas under Janah ad-Dawla's control around Homs in pale yellow.

Janah ad-Dawla (died 1103) was the Arab Seljuq emir of Homs during the late eleventh century.

== Biography ==
Janah ad-Dawla was the atabeg of Ridwan and participated in the failed campaign of Ridwan's father Tutush I to gain the Seljuk throne, which ended with the latter's death in the battle of Rayy in 1095. Thereafter, he fled to Aleppo, where he managed to persuade the garrison of the citadel to recognise Ridwan as their ruler. In 1095, he clashed in battle with Turkish forces of Yusuf bin Abaq, another former Turkish commander under Tutush who had joined Yağısıyan, the Turkish governor of Antioch. Thereafter, Janah and Yağısıyan attempted to take the city of Edessa, but its Greek governor Thoros managed to keep the city and afterwards Janah and Yağısıyan were at odds. The following two years Janah and Ridwan campaigned against Ridwan's brother Duqaq, the ruler of Damascus, but were unable to achieve anything. After another battle on 22 March 1097, Janah and Ridwan fell out and Janah had to flee to Homs, which he came to rule.

He later joined Kerbogha's army during the second siege of Antioch in 1098. He was murdered by three Assassins in 1103, apparently by order of al-Hakim al-Munajjim and apparently instigated by Ridwan.

== Bibliography ==
- Beihammer, Alexander Daniel (2017). Byzantium and the Emergence of Muslim-Turkish Anatolia, Ca. 1040-1130 Volumen 20 de Birmingham Byzantine and Ottoman Studies. Taylor & Francis. pp. 254–255. ISBN 9781351983860.
