= Abu Tahir al-Sa'igh =

Nizari leader in Syria

- ابو طاهر الصائغ
- Born: Unknown; Persia
- Died: Aleppo
- Citizenship: Nizari Ismaili state Emirate of Aleppo
- Occupation(s): Missionary, goldsmith
- Predecessor: Al-Hakim al-Munajjim
- Successor: Bahram al-Da'i

Abu Tahir al-Sa'igh (Arabic: ابو طاهر الصائغ, "Abu Tahir the Goldsmith"), recorded as Botherus in Christian sources, was a Persian goldsmith and the chief Nizari Isma'ili da'i of Syria, belonging to the order of Assassins.

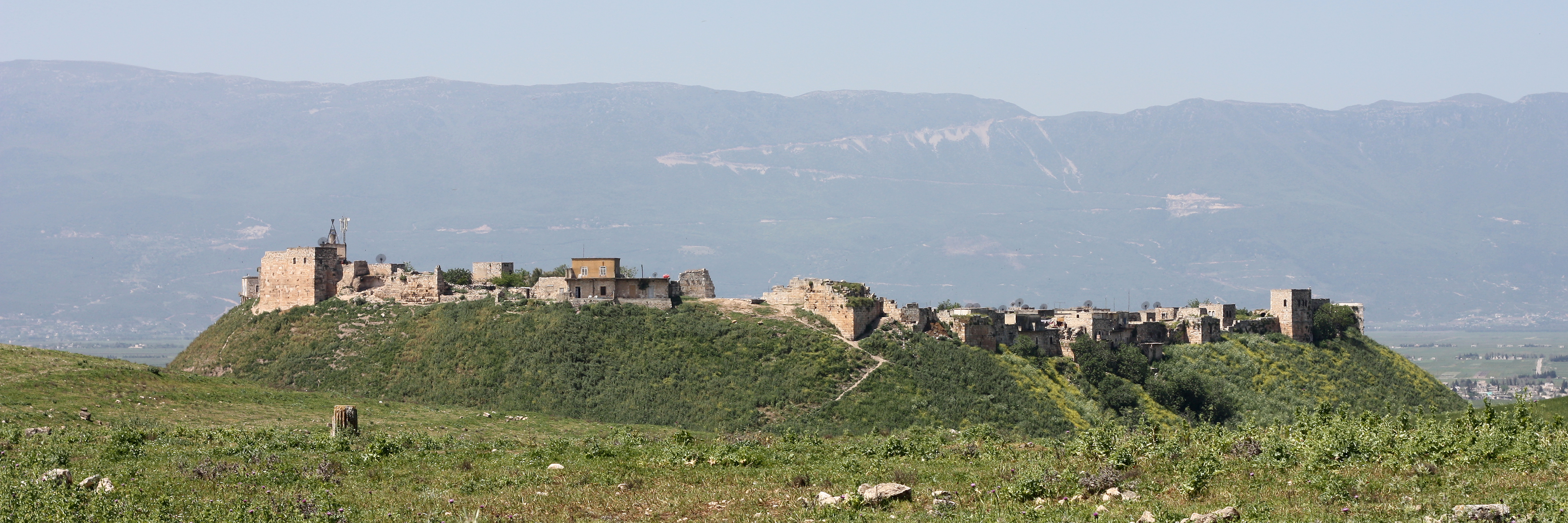
The citadel of Afamiyya, briefly held by Abu Tahir al-Sa'igh

Abu Tahir was the second Nizari da'i in Syria sent by Hassan-i Sabbah, replacing al-Hakim al-Munajjim, and enjoying alliance with Ridwan. He kept using the Nizari base in Aleppo, while continuing the Nizari strategy of seizing strongholds in pro-Isma'ili areas, focusing on the Jabal al-Summaq highlands located between the Orontes River and Aleppo. At this time, the authority over the upper Orontes valley was shared between Janah al-Dawlah of Homs, Munqidhites of Shaizar, and Khalaf ibn Mula'ib, the Fatimid governor of Apamea based in its citadel Qal'at al-Mudhiq. Janah al-Dawlah had been murdered in 1103 by al-Hakim al-Munajjim, and Khalaf ibn Mula'ib three years later. Khalaf ibn Mula'ib was probably a Musta'li Isma'ili that refused to cooperate with the Nizari Isma'ilis under Abu Tahir, was murdered in February 1106 with the help of Abu'l Fath of Sarmin, an Ismaili da'i. Abu Tahir and Abu'l Fath subsequently captured Qal'at al-Mudhiq and Apamea by an "ingenious" plan. Tancred, the Frankish regent of the Principality of Antioch besieged Apamea, but was unsuccessful. A few months later he besieged the city again with the help of Mus'ab ibn Mula'ib, brother of the murdered Khalaf, and captured Apamea in September 1106. Abu'l Fath was executed, while Abu Tahir ransomed himself and went to Aleppo.

In 1111, an abortive assassination attempt against Abu Harb Isa ibn Zayd, a wealthy Aleppine Persian, caused a general public resentment of the Nizari Ismailis in Aleppo. Ridwan nevertheless provided support for the Nizaris. Ridwan died in 1113 and the Nizaris of Aleppo were deprived of this important ally. During the short reign of his young son Alp Arslan al-Akhras, who ceded the Balis fortress on the Aleppo–Baghdad road to Abu Tahir. During his anti-Nizari campaign, the Seljuq sultan Muhammad I Tapar sent Sa'id ibn Badi', the rais of Aleppo, to turn Alp Arslan against the Nizaris. Abu Tahir and many other Nizaris in Aleppo were subsequently executed and others dispersed or went underground.

Abu Tahir was succeeded by Bahram al-Da'i.
