= Khalaf ibn Mula'ib =

Arab emir of Homs and Apamea

Sayf al-Dawla Khalaf ibn Mulāʿib al-Ashhabī al-Kilābī (Arabic: سيف الدولة خلف بن ملاعب الأشهبي الكلابي; died 3 February 1106) was the emir of Homs and Apamea between 1082 and 1090. He later seized Apamea again in 490 A.H./1096 from Ridwan and held the city, under the suzerainty of the Fatimid Caliphate, until his assassination by the Assassins.

== Life ==
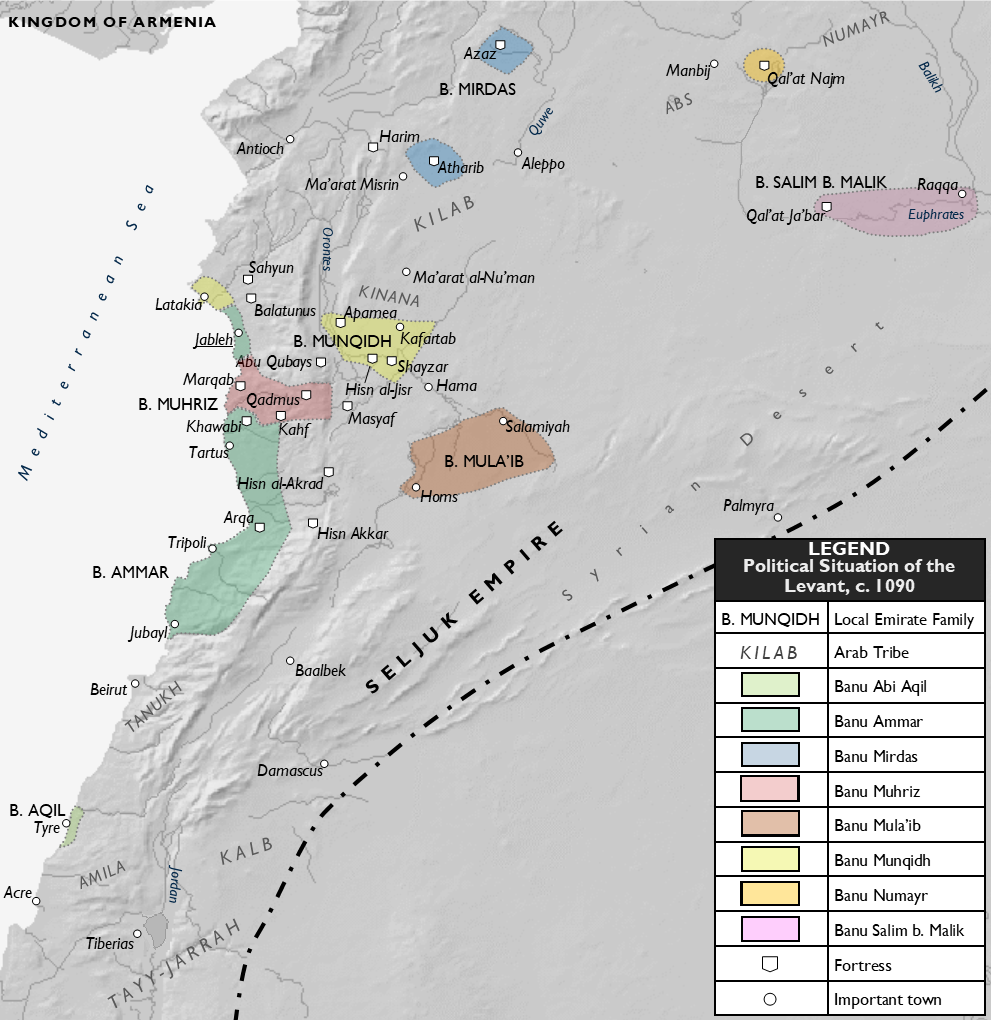
Political map of the Levant around 1085 with Khalaf's territory shaded in brown

Khalaf ibn Mula'ib belonged to the Arab tribe of Banu Kilab. He was made the emir of Homs in 1082 by the Uqaylid emir of Aleppo, Muslim ibn Quraysh. Muslim installed Khalaf in Homs to serve as buffer between his northern Syrian domain and his Seljuk enemies based in Damascus. Khalaf later expanded his emirate northward to Apamea. In 1083 he captured Salamiyah in the desert east of Homs. During his assault on the town, he threw the town's sharif (a descendant of the Islamic prophet Muhammad), Ibrahim al-Hashimi, against one of Salamiyah's towers from a mangonel. Khalaf is credited in an inscription found in the Mosque of Salamiyah for repairing a mashhad (mausoleum) for one of the "hidden" Isma'ili imams Abd Allah in 1088. The inscription reads:

Its [the mashhad's] builder is the most illustrious amīr, the elect, the defender of the rule, the sword of the state, Khalaf b. Mulāʿib; may Allah perpetuate his elevated position in the year 481 (=1088/89).

After complaints about Khalaf's actions reached the Seljuk sultan Malik-Shah I, the latter dispatched his brother Tutush I, the Seljuk prince of Damascus, and other Seljuk princes in Syria to apprehend Khalaf. He was subsequently ousted from Homs in 1090 and from Apamea in 1091. He was arrested, put into an iron cage, and sent to prison in Isfahan, the Seljuk capital. After Malikshah's death in 1092, his widow freed Khalaf who then left for Cairo, capital of the Fatimid Caliphate. In 1095/96, representatives of Apamea went to Cairo requesting a governor from the Fatimids. Khalaf was chosen, and may have been proposed by Apamea's representatives themselves. Khalaf served as the lord of Apamea under the suzerainty of the Fatimids.

On 3 February 1106, Khalaf was assassinated by a squad of Assassins. The assassination was the fruition of a conspiracy by Ridwan, his Nizari ally Abu Tahir al-Sa'igh (the chief da'i of Syria), and their mutual collaborator, a certain Abu'l Fath of Sarmin. The latter was staying in Apamea at the time and arranged for a hole to be made in the city walls, allowing the entry of the Assassins. Khalaf confronted them, but was struck in the abdomen by one of their daggers. He attempted to escape, but died within minutes as a result of his wound. The Ismailis then proclaimed Ridwan as ruler of Apamea. Some of Khalaf's sons and guards were also killed in the attack, but one of his sons, Musbih, escaped and found refuge with the Banu Munqidh of Shaizar. Musbih later cooperated with the Crusader prince Tancred to take over Apamea in August 1106. After the city's capture, Tancred gave fiefs in Apamea's vicinity to Musbih and other surviving sons of Khalaf.

== Bibliography ==
- Lewis, B. (1995). "Khalaf ibn Mula'ib". In Bosworth, C. E.; van Donzel, E.; Heinrichs, W. P. & Lecomte, G. (eds.). The Encyclopaedia of Islam, Second Edition. Volume VIII: Ned–Sam. Leiden: E. J. Brill. p. 919. ISBN 978-90-04-09834-3.
- Gibb, H. A. R. (2002) [1932]. The Damascus Chronicle of the Crusades: Extracted and Translated from the Chronicle of Ibn Al-Qalanisi (2nd ed.). Luzac and Co.
- Sharon, Moshe (2007). Corpus Inscriptionum Arabicarum Palestinae, Addendum: Squeezes in the Max van Berchem Collection (Palestine, Trans-Jordan, Northern Syria), Squeezes 1–84. Leiden and Boston: Brill. ISBN 978-90-04-15780-4.
