= Al-Hakim al-Munajjim =

Medieval Persian astrologer

- الحكيم المنجم
- Born: Unknown; Persia
- Died: May–June 1103; Aleppo
- Citizenship: Nizari Ismaili state Emirate of Aleppo
- Occupations: Missionary; Astrologer; Physician
- Office: Chief Da'i of Syria
- Predecessor: office established
- Successor: Abu Tahir al-Sa'igh

Al-Hakim al-Munajjim (Arabic: الحكيم المنجم, literally "The Physician-Astrologer") (died 1103) was a Persian Nizari Isma'ili and the first Nizari missionary (da'i) in Syria, belonging to the order of Assassins.

== History ==
Al-Hakim al-Munajjim was sent from Alamut Castle to Syria in the 12th century, probably accompanied with a number of subordinate da'is. He appeared in Aleppo in northern Syria, which was a suitable place for him to begin his career, as it had a prominent Shi'a population, and was close to Jabal al-Summaq, which was already influenced by Isma'ilism. Furthermore, the Seljuk ruler (amir) of the city, Ridwan, was in a weak military position relative to other rival Syrian amirs, and was seeking new alliances. Al-Hakim al-Munajjim managed to gain the favor of Ridwan, and they openly allied with each other; the Nizaris established their Mission House (dar al-dawah) in Aleppo and openly began their religious activities. Some argue that Ridwan himself may have been a Nizari Isma'ili convert, but this is unlikely. In May 1103, Janah ad-Dawla, the independent ruler of Homs and a key opponent of Ridwan, was assassinated by three Persian fida'i at the Great Mosque of al-Nuri, Homs. This was apparently ordered by al-Hakim al-Munajjim. The event shocked the city, and most of the Turks of Homs fled to Damascus. Duqaq, the amir of Damascus, then quickly captured Homs, preventing its fall to the Franks. Al-Hakim al-Munajjim died a few weeks after the death of Janah ad-Dawla. He was succeeded as the Nizari da'i of Syria by another Persian, Abu Tahir al-Sa'igh.
