= Quhistan =

Historical region of the Iranian Plateau

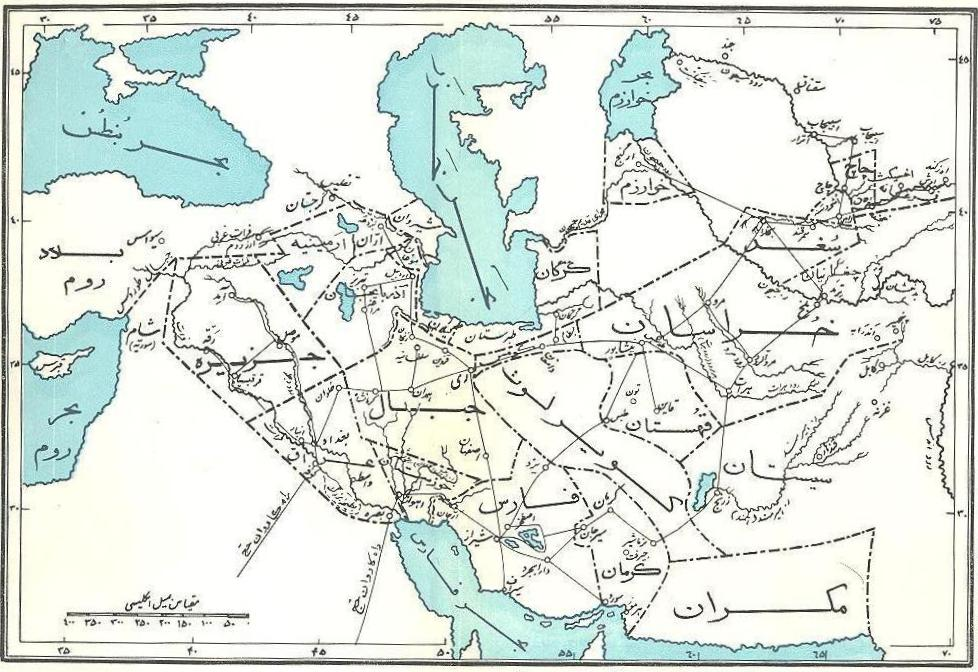

Quhistan (Persian: قهستان) or Kohistan (کهستان, "mountainous land") was a region of medieval Persia, essentially the southern part of Khurasan. Its boundaries appear to have been south of Khorasan to north, Yazd to West, Sistan to South, Afghanistan to East. Quhistan was a province in old days with a rich history in Persian literature, art and science. Notable historical towns include Tun (modern-day Ferdows), Qa'in, Gunabad, Tabas, Birjand, Turshez (modern-day Kashmar), Khwaf, Taybad, and Zawah (modern-day Torbat-e Heydarieh). It is home to famous castles. Safron, berberies (Zereshk) and jujube (Annab) are among the famous agricultural products that are exclusively produced in Ghohestan. Hakim Nezari Ghohestani, Sima Bina and Professor Reza Ghohestani are among famous people who are originally from Ghohestan.

Dagestan in the North Caucasus was previously and originally named "Quhistan", which has the same meaning as Dagestan: dağ and kuh are the Turkic and Persian words for "mountain", respectively. -istan is Persian suffix meaning "land [of]".

== See also ==
- Nizari Ismaili state

== Sources ==
- C. Edmund Bosworth. "The Ismai'ilis of Quhistan" in Farhad Daftary. Medieval Isma'ili History and Thought.
