= Da'i =

Subclass of islamic missionary

A da'i (Arabic: داعي, romanized: dāʿī, lit. 'inviter, caller', [ˈdæːʕi(ː)]) is generally someone who engages in Dawah, the act of inviting people to Islam.

Dāʿī the inviter or summoner, i.e. the one who invites to true religion, as God says: "And as a summoner unto Allah by His permission, and as a luminous lamp" (33:46).

In this verse the Prophet is called da'i because he himself used to do Dawah and others used to do it under his supervision. In the time of the Prophet there were definitely Dāʿī's to invite on his behalf, for the main function of Prophethood and Dawah is carried on under his supervision.

== See also ==
- Dawah
- Da'i al-Mutlaq, 'the absolute (unrestricted) missionary'
- Hujja
- List of converts to Islam
