= Siege of Alamut (1256) =

1256 Mongol siege of Nizari capital

- Part of the Mongol campaign against the Nizaris
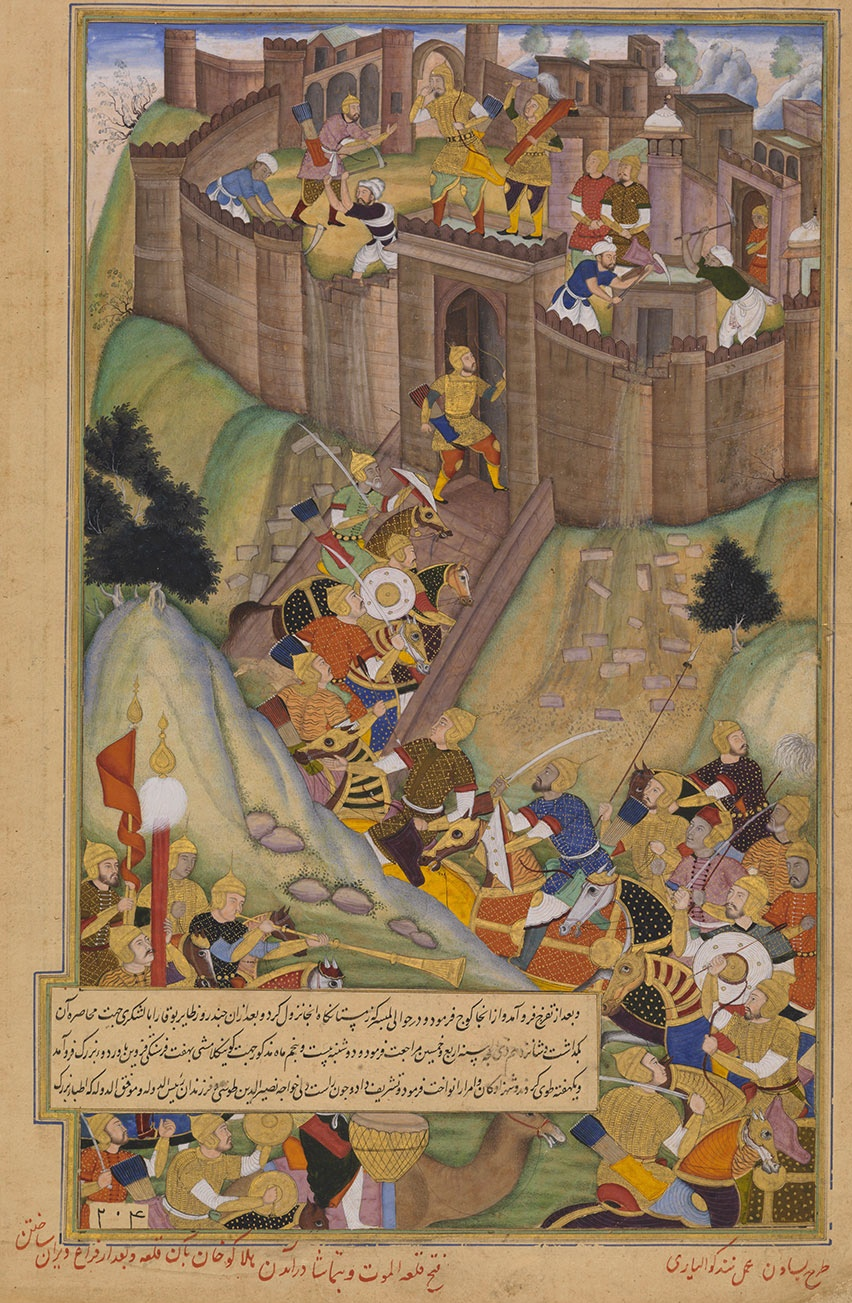
- A late 16th-century Mughal miniature of Hulegu Khan’s forces breaching the walls of Alamut.
| Date | December 1256 |
| Location | Alamut Castle, Alborz Mountains, Persia (modern-day Qazvin Province, Iran) 36°26′41″N 50°35′11″E |
| Result | Mongol victory |

Belligerents
| Mongol Empire: Oirats | Nizari Ismaili state (Assassins) |

Commanders and leaders
| Hulegu Khan; Balaghai | Sipahsalar Muqaddam al-Din Muhammad Mubariz (surrendered) |
- Location within Iran

The Siege of Alamut took place in December 1256, and marks the fall of the strategic fort of Alamut Castle, which was the capital of the Nizari Ismaili state, to the Mongol Empire under Hulegu Khan. Following the capitulation of the Nizari Imam, Rukn al-Din Khurshah during the siege of Maymun-Diz, Hulegu Khan dispatched forces to secure the fortress. Although difficult to assault and well-provisioned for a long siege, the commander of the fortress, Muqaddam al-Din Muhammad Mubariz, capitulated the stronghold in obedience to the Imam's orders. The Mongols subsequently dismantled the fortifications and destroyed its famous library, officially ending the Nizari state as a political entity in Persia.

== Background ==
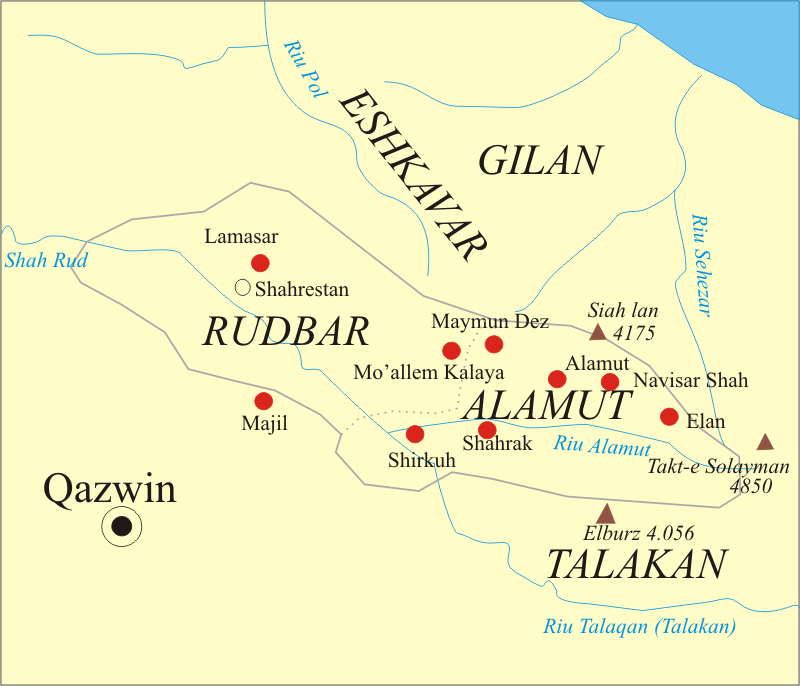
The Nizari heartland: the regions Alamut and Rudbar

On 8 November 1256, Hulegu Khan set up camp on a hilltop facing Maymun-Diz and encircled the fortress with his forces by marching over the Alamut mountains via the Taleqan valley and appearing at the foot of Maymun-Diz. Maymun-Diz could have been attacked by mangonels; that was not the case with Alamut, Nevisar Shah, Lambsar and Gerdkuh, all of which were on top of high peaks. Nevertheless, the strength of the fortification impressed the Mongols, who surveyed it from various angles to find a weak point. Since the winter was approaching, Hülegü was advised by the majority of his lieutenants to postpone the siege, but he decided to proceed. Preliminary bombardments were performed for three days by mangonels from a nearby hilltop with casualties on both sides. A direct Mongol assault on the fourth day was repulsed. The Mongols then used heavier siege engines hurling javelins dipped in burning pitch and set up additional mangonels all around the fortifications.

Later that month, Kuhrshah sent a message offering his surrender on the condition of the immunity of him and his family. Hülegü's royal decree was sent by Ata-Malik Juvayni, who took it personally to Khurshah, asking for his signature, but Khurshah was hesitant. After several days, Hülegü began another bombardment and on 19 November, Khurshah and his entourage descended from the fortress and surrendered. The evacuation of the fortress continued until the next day. A small part of the garrison refused to surrender and fought in a last stand in a high domed building in the fortress; they were defeated and slaughtered after three days.

An inexplicable aspect of the events for historians is why Alamut made no effort to assist their besieged comrades in Maymun-Diz. Khurshah instructed all Nizari castles of the Rusbar valley to capitulate, evacuate, and dismantle their forts. All castles (around forty) subsequently capitulated, except Alamut (under sipahsalar Muqaddam al-Din Muhammad Mubariz) and Lambsar, possibly because their commanders thought the Imam had issued orders under duress and was practicing a sort of taqiyya. Despite the small size of the fortress and its garrison, Alamut was stone-built (unlike Maymun-Diz), well-provisioned, and featured a reliable water supply. However, the Nizari faith demands the faithful pay absolute obedience to the Imam in all circumstances. Hülegü surrounded Alamut with his army, and Khurshah unsuccessfully attempted to persuade its commander to surrender. Hülegü left a large force under Balaghai to besiege Alamut, and himself together with Khurshah set out to besiege the nearby Lambsar.

== Siege ==
Balaghai, advanced to the base of Alamut Castle, the symbolic and strategic center of the Nizari state. The Mongols demanded the surrender of the fortress and conveyed Khurshah’s orders, offering clemency if the garrison submitted within a limited time. Despite these doubts, the doctrine of obedience to the Imam ultimately determined the outcome. The Mongol army subsequently occupied Alamut and began dismantling its fortifications. The surrender avoided a potentially lengthy and difficult siege, as Alamut was considered a formidable and well-provisioned stronghold. The defense of Alamut was entrusted to Muqaddam al-Din, who initially hesitated. He questioned whether the Imam’s instructions had been issued freely or under coercion. Muqaddam al-Din and the garrison complied with Khurshah’s and surrendered the fortress without a prolonged siege. Muqaddam al-Din eventually capitulated when he learned that the Imam wasn't obligated to surrender after a few days in December 1256.

Juvayni describes the difficulty by which the Mongols dismantled the plastered walls and lead-covered ramparts of Alamut. The Mongols had to set fire to the buildings and then destroy them piece by piece. He also notes the extensive chambers, galleries, and deep tanks, replete with wine, vinegar, honey, and other goods. During the pillage, one man was almost drowned in a honey store. Hulegu tasked an emir with a "large number of soldiers and levies" to demolish the walls, which took a "long time", according to Juvayni.

According to Juvayni, he became responsible to take care of Alamut's famous library. After examining it, according to himself, he saved copies of the Qur'an and other choice books as well as astronomical instruments (such as astrolabes), and burned the other books. He also picked Hasan Sabbah's biography, Sargudhasht-i Bābā Sayyidinā (Persian: سرگذشت بابا سیدنا), which interested him, but he claims he burnt it after reading it. Juvayni has extensively used the contents of this book, and most likely other books from the Alamut library, to compile the last chapter of his Tarikh-i Jahangushay which deals with the history of Fatimid Caliphate and the Ismailis. He has also cited another book from the library, Tarikh-i Jil wa Daylam.

== Aftermath ==
By 1256, Hülegü almost eliminated the Persian Nizaris as an independent military force. Khurshah was then taken to Qazvin where he sent messages to the Syrian Nizari stronghold instructing them to surrender, but they did not act, believing that the Imam was acting under duress. As his position became intolerable, Khurshah asked Hülegü to be allowed to go meet Möngke in Mongolia, promising that he would persuade the remaining Ismaili fortresses to surrender. Möngke Khan rebuked him after visiting him in Karakoram, Mongolia, due to his failure to hand over Lambsar and Gerdkuh, and ordered his return to his homeland. On the way, he and his small retinue were executed by their Mongol escort. Möngke meanwhile issued a general massacre of all Nizari Ismailis, including all of Khurshah's family as well as the garrisons. Khurshah's relatives who were kept at Qazvin were killed by Qaraqai Bitikchi, while Ötegü-China summoned the Nizaris of Quhistan to gatherings and slaughtered about 12,000 people. Möngke's order reflects an earlier order by Chingiz Khan. Around 100,000 people are estimated to have been killed.
