= Hamideh Choubak =

Iranian female archaeologist

- حمیده چوبک
- Born: 1952 (age 73–74); Bushehr, Iran
- Education: University of Tehran; Tarbiat Modares University
- Known for: Excavations and conservation at Alamut Castle; archaeological research at historic Jiroft
- Scientific career
- Fields: Archaeology, Islamic archaeology, cultural heritage conservation
- Institutions: Iranian Center for Archaeological Research; Research Institute of Cultural Heritage and Tourism; Alamut Cultural Heritage Base

Hamideh Choubak (Persian: حمیده چوبک; born 1952) is an Iranian archaeologist specialising in the archaeology of the Islamic period and cultural heritage conservation. She was the first woman appointed director of the Iranian Center for Archaeological Research, Iran's principal state institution responsible for archaeological research and fieldwork.

Choubak has directed archaeological projects in the Alamut region, the historic Islamic-period city of Jiroft and the Jazmurian basin. She is particularly associated with the long-term excavation, documentation and conservation of Alamut Castle, where she directed sixteen seasons of archaeological excavation beginning in 2001. In 2026, Alamūt Castle and Related Fortifications, comprising Alamut and six associated fortresses, was inscribed on the UNESCO World Heritage List.

== Early life and education ==
Choubak was born in Bushehr in 1952. She received her bachelor's degree in archaeology from the University of Tehran in 1974 and a master's degree in archaeology from the same university in 1984. Her master's thesis examined the typology and iconography of Islamic ceramics.

She received a doctorate in archaeology from Tarbiat Modares University in 2004. Her doctoral dissertation examined cultural continuity in the Jazmurian region and the ancient city of Jiroft during the Islamic period, under the supervision of archaeologist Mohammad Yusef Kiani.

== Career ==
Choubak began working at the Iranian Centre for Archaeology in 1975. During her career she worked at institutions including the former Iran Bastan Museum, now part of the National Museum of Iran, the Abgineh Museum of Tehran, the Sa'dabad and Niavaran museum complexes, and the Islamic-period department of the National Museum.

Her field experience has included archaeological work at ancient Ray, Tepe Hissar, Tepe Mil near Varamin, Darreh Shahr in Ilam Province, Susa, Haft Tappeh, the Portuguese fortifications on Hormuz Island, and Rab'-e Rashidi in Tabriz.

In January 2014, Choubak was appointed director of the Iranian Center for Archaeological Research. Radio Zamaneh reported that she was the first woman to hold the position. She served as director until 2017 and retired from her position as an associate professor at the Research Institute of Cultural Heritage and Tourism later that year. A 2022 academic publication continued to identify her as an associate professor affiliated with the Research Institute of Cultural Heritage and Tourism.

In November 2008, Choubak was elected to the executive board of ICOMOS Iran, the Iranian national committee of the International Council on Monuments and Sites.

== Jiroft and Jazmurian ==
Choubak's research in southeastern Iran has focused on the Jazmurian cultural region and the Islamic-period settlement known as the historic city of Jiroft or Daqyanus. She directed two seasons of excavation in the Jazmurian region, rescue excavations in the Jiroft area and six seasons of excavation at the historic Islamic city.

The historic city investigated by Choubak should be distinguished from the prehistoric sites associated with the better-known Jiroft culture. Her work concentrated on the Islamic-period urban settlement and its wider cultural landscape. Excavations under her direction identified elements of an urban complex including a mosque, bazaar, public square, cemetery, water-distribution system and craft or industrial workshops.

Her research on the region resulted in publications on Islamic ceramics and the cultural geography of Jazmurian and Jiroft. In 2012, she published the book Jiroft and Its Neighbours and Cultural Relatives through Iran's Cultural Heritage Organization.

== Alamut ==
Choubak's longest-running field project has been the archaeology and conservation of Alamut Castle and the wider Alamut cultural landscape in Qazvin Province. She became director of the Alamut Cultural Heritage Base in 2001 and remained in the position until 2019; she was reappointed to lead the base in 2020.

Beginning in 2001, she directed sixteen excavation seasons at Alamut Castle and one season at Lambsar Castle. Her work combined archaeological excavation with documentation, structural conservation and study of the wider landscape and associated fortifications.

The excavations exposed previously buried parts of the castle and contributed to the identification of its entrance complex, central courtyard, residential and administrative areas, storage installations and water-management systems. Choubak's project also examined fortifications in the surrounding region and their relationship to Alamut as the political and military centre of the medieval Nizari Isma'ili state.

At the 9th International Congress on the Archaeology of the Ancient Near East, held at the University of Basel in 2014, Choubak presented the results of excavations of a structure at Alamut known as the Molasara. She interpreted the excavated complex as a domed building containing a command centre and mosque associated with the Isma'ili occupation of the fortress. The excavation produced architectural remains, brick decoration and glazed and lustre-painted tiles dating to the eleventh through thirteenth centuries.

Choubak also presented the Alamut excavations at the 2010 World Congress for Middle Eastern Studies in Barcelona, in a session chaired by Ismaili historian Farhad Daftary.

Her work at Alamut subsequently expanded beyond excavation to encompass site management, conservation, local heritage, historic villages and the development of an archaeological park. A study co-authored by Choubak and published in 2022 examined the use of archaeological parks as a model for the sustainable preservation and management of historic sites; the research was based in part on a University of Tehran thesis concerning an archaeological park for Alamut Castle.

=== World Heritage inscription ===
On 26 July 2026, the World Heritage Committee inscribed Alamūt Castle and Related Fortifications on the World Heritage List under criterion (iii). The serial property consists of Alamut Castle and six associated fortifications: Lambesar, Navizarshah, Shams Kelayeh, Qostinlar, Shirkuh and Ilan.

UNESCO described the network as evidence of the political, military and intellectual organisation of the Nizari Ismailis from the late eleventh century. The long-term archaeological and conservation programme at Alamut, including Choubak's excavations and documentation, preceded the preparation and eventual inscription of the property.

Following the inscription, media reports in Iran highlighted Choubak's approximately twenty-five years of archaeological and conservation work at the site.

== Research and publications ==
Choubak's research focuses on Islamic-period archaeology, ceramics, archaeological conservation, the archaeology of southeastern Iran and the architecture and material culture of Alamut.

Among her publications are studies on the Islamic ceramics of historic Jiroft, the rock-cut architecture of Alamut, water engineering at the fortress and the architectural decoration of the Alamut complex.

Selected publications include:

- Choubak, Hamideh (2009). “Alamut Castle (Eagle's Nest): Hassan Sabbah Stronghold.” The International Journal of Humanities. 16 (2): 1–28.
- Choubak, Hamideh (2012). Jiroft and Its Neighbours and Cultural Relatives. Tehran: Iranian Cultural Heritage Organization. (in Persian)
- Khademzade, Mohammad Hassan; Choubak, Hamideh; Khorami, Roya (2022). “Archeological park, an appropriate pattern for preservation and sustainable development of historical sites.” Journal of Iranian Architecture & Urbanism. 13 (1): 215–229. doi:10.30475/isau.2021.237059.1451.
- Choubak, Hamideh; Kiani, Mohammad Yusef (2005). “Jazmurian Cultural & Geographical Region in Archaeological Studies.” Human Sciences Modarres. 8 (4): 31–69.

She also translated Ernie Haerinck's study of Parthian pottery into Persian, published by the Iranian Cultural Heritage Organization in 1997.

== Recognition ==
Choubak's appointment in 2014 made her the first woman to head the Iranian Center for Archaeological Research. Her professional activities have also included membership of national cultural-heritage technical councils and the executive board of ICOMOS Iran.

In 2022, she was selected as one of the figures honoured in Iran's programme recognising prominent specialists in cultural heritage.

Her archaeological career was the subject of the documentary From Sabah to Choubak (Persian: از صباح تا چوبک), directed by Minoo Beigi and produced in 2009. The documentary follows Choubak's work at Alamut Castle and her winter excavation at the historic city of Daqyanus near Jiroft.

== See also ==
- Alamut Castle
- Jiroft
- Archaeology of Iran
