= Muhammad III of Alamut =

26th Nizari Ismaili Shia Imam (1221–1255)

Muhammad III
- 26th Ismaili Nizari Imam Ala al-Din Muhammad
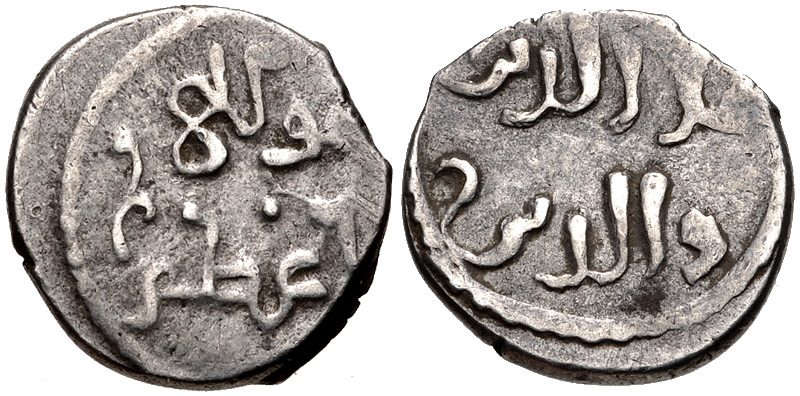

26th Imam of the Nizari Ismaili Shias
- Tenure: 1221 – 1 December 1255
- Predecessor: Jalal al-Din Hasan
- Successor: Rukn al-Dīn al-Hasan ibn Muhammad Khurshāh
- Born: 608 AH/1211 AD
- Died: 653 AH/1255 AD

ʿAlāʾ al-Dīn Muḥammad III (Persian: علاءالدین محمد; 1211–1255), more commonly known as ʿAlāʾ al-Dīn (Persian: علاءالدین), son of Jalāl al-Dīn Ḥasan III, was the 26th Nizāri Isma'ilism Imām. He ruled the Nizari Ismaili state from 1221 to 1255. By some accounts, he was considered a respected scholar and the spiritual and worldly leader of the Nisari Ismailis. The intellectual life of Persia has been described as having flourished during his 34-year reign. Allegedly, he was known for his tolerance and pluralism. His reign witnessed the beginnings of the Mongol conquests of Persia and the eastern Muslim world. He was assassinated by an unknown perpetrator on 1 December 1255, and was succeeded by his eldest son, Rukn al-Din Khurshah, in 1255.

== Life ==
Alauddin Muhammad, also known as Muhammad III, was born in 1213. At the age of nine, upon the death of his father, he became the ruler of the Alamut. However, his mother took over the administration of state affairs and governed Alamut for the next six years (1221–1227), making her the first woman to do so in Alamut's history. This period was a time of relative peace in Alamut, during which the Imam's mother seems to have deposed many incapable governors in Rudhbar and Kohistan, possibly due to suspicions that they had misused their powers.

When Alauddin Muhammad's mother died in 1227, he took full control of the Alamut at the age of 15 or 16. He dealt with the misusers of power strongly and firmly, causing most of them to turn against him and flee to Qazvin. In an attempt to cover up their wrongdoings, possibly including defalcation, some of the governors spread rumors against the Imam, claiming that a physician's operation a few months before the death of his mother had damaged his brain and caused excessive blood loss. However, this opposition was quickly surmounted. According to The History of the World-Conqueror, Muhammad III was insane.

Under Muhammad III's reign, the Sunni conformity that had been initiated by his father was gradually and quietly reversed. As a result, his community increasingly regarded itself openly as Ismaili Shi'ite.

He was assassinated by an unknown perpetrator on 1 December 1255, and was succeeded by his eldest son Rukn al-Din Khurshah in 1255.

== Education and intellectual leadership ==
Alāʾ ad-Dīn Muḥammad was an esteemed scholar who studied spiritual, philosophical, and jurisprudence sciences. He was well known for his mystical statements, which reflected his profound knowledge. He established a special school to train da'is in the correct principles of inviting people to Nizari Isma'ili Islam.

He authored a seminal constitution for the Nizari Ismailis, entitled Murids. One of the da’is, Shams al-Den ibn Ahmad ibn Yaqoub al-Taibi (شمس الدين بن أحمد بن يعقوب الطيبي), documented that the treatise named The Constitution and the Call to the Believers to Attendance (الدستور و دعوة المؤمنين إلى الحضور) was delivered to him by Da’i Nasir al-Din al-Tusi, who obtained it directly from Ala’ al-Din Muhammad. This treatise also mentioned that Ala’ al-Din Muhammad dictated to his hujja, Shams al-Den ibn Ahmad ibn Yaqoub al-Taibi, a document called The Constitution of Mawlana Ala'audeen, which displayed his high intellectual and scientific capacities.

Alāʾ ad-Dīn Muḥammad offered special attention to the learned discussions and debates that took place in Alamut. He assigned one day per week to philosophical and doctrinal debates between da'is, guiding them to polish their skills for dialectical debating and offering pedagogical and argumentation techniques that made them proficient in dialectical discussions and arguments.

The Syrian Nizārī author Qays bin Manṣūr All-Dādīkhī (1201–1257) was his da'i to Syria. He had important philosophical treatises as Risālat al-Asābīʿ, ed., ʿĀrif Tāmir, in his Khams Rasāʾil Ismāʿīliyya (pp. 057–079), which discussed esoteric exegesis (taʾwīl) of certain Quranic verses and Ismaili theology related to the number seven. All-Dādīkhī was a talented poet; in the presence of Alāʾ ad-Dīn Muḥammad and his son Imam Rukn al-Din Khurshah, he expressed a poem titled "Degree of the Fatimid Imam is Glorified" (قدر الإمام الفاطمي معظم), the verses of which affirm the Fatimid origin of Alāʾ ad-Dīn Muḥammad.

More recent studies have revealed that intellectual life flourished during the long reign of Alāʾ al-Din Muhammad and was bolstered by an influx of outside scholars who fled the first waves of Mongol invasions and found refuge in the Nizari fortress communities of Persia. Foremost among such scholars who availed themselves of the Nizari libraries and patronage was Nasir al-Din al-Tusi, a polymath who made major contributions to Nizari Ismaili thought of the late Alamut period during his three decades of residency. As elaborated in his spiritual autobiography, Sayr wa Suluk, al-Tusi converted to Ismailism sometime during his prolonged association with the Nizari Ismailis.

== Tolerance and pluralism ==
Alāʾ al-Din Muhammad was very inclusive and pluralistic in his outlook. He granted patronage and shelter to various scholars from surrounding countries destroyed by the Mongol invasion. He granted access to libraries and offered all kinds of support. Nasir al-Din al-Tusi was one of his prominent da'is who contributed to Ismaili theology.

Alāʾ al-Din Muhammad's alliance with the larger Muslim community enlarged Nizari's political boundaries. The grand vision of world domination returned for a time. Purely local squabbles were replaced by ambitious diplomatic activities in lands as far away as Europe and Mongolia, while a Nizari religious mission was firmly established in India. Financial tribute for their safety was received from political leaders as distant as Germany, Aragon, and Yemen.

Besides his missions to create a Christian–Muslim coalition in anticipation of the Mongols' invasion, Alāʾ al-Din Muhammad was among the first to send peaceful messages to the Great Khan Guyuk in Mongolia in full collaboration with the Sunni Abbasid Caliphate. The relationship with Abbasid Caliphate during his leadership was friendly and cordial. Additionally, he sent da'is to Sind to establish Nizāri Ismāʿilī Islam in the Indian subcontinent.

== Maymun-Diz fortress ==
Maymūn-Diz (Persian: میمون دز) was a major castle with a unique construction style built during the reign of Alāʾ ad-Dīn Muḥammad on a high rock with a sharp cliff. It played an important role for the Nizari Ismailis of the Alamut period, which is well-captured historical records.

== Silver coins ==
Silver coins were used in Seljuk Iran for the first time in 618 AH (1221 CE), in the early period of Alāʾ ad-Dīn Muḥammad's rule.

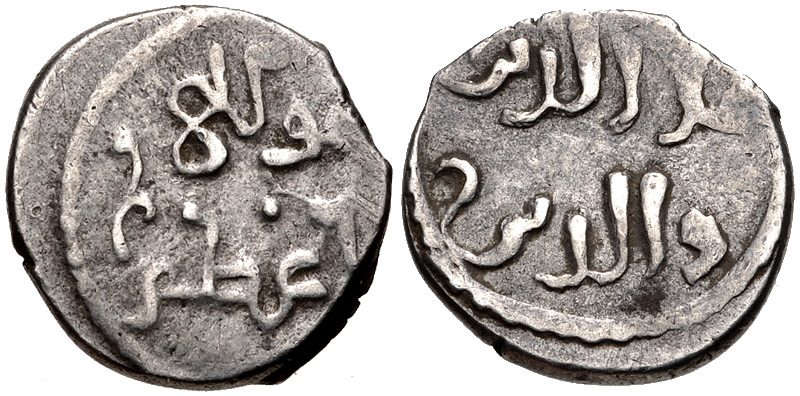
Silver coins minted during the rule of Alāʾ ad-Dīn Muḥammad

== Publication bias ==
Many accounts about Alāʾ ad-Dīn Muḥammad might reflect the religious bias of Atâ-Malek Juvayni, who alleged that his rule was described as "cruel, imperious, sadistic, alcoholic, and unpredictable". Juvayni was an important Sunni official of the Mongol empire which invaded and destroyed the Ismaili state.

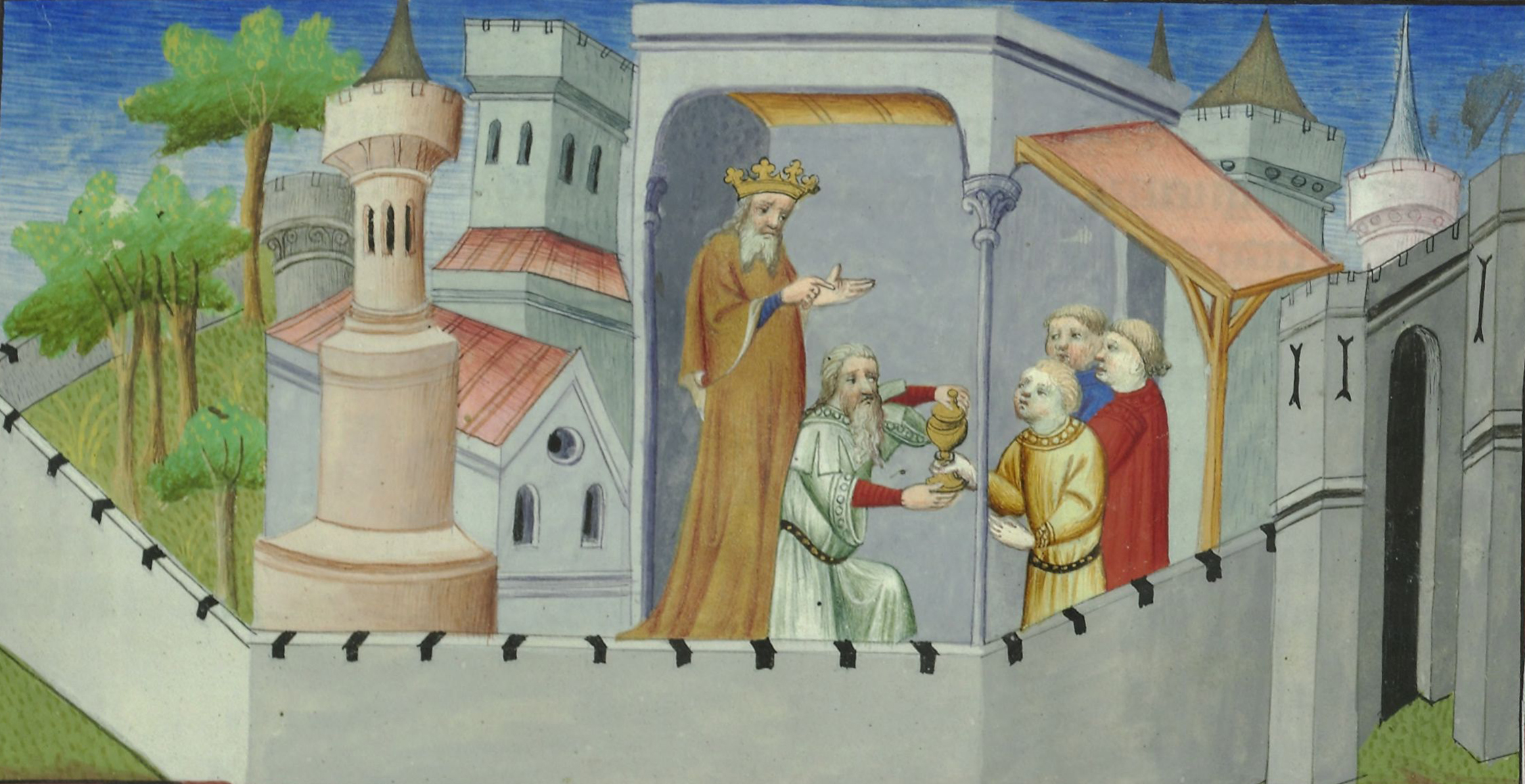
Alāʾ al-Din Muhammad drugging his disciples (manuscript from The Travels of Marco Polo)

Marco Polo's description of Alāʾ al-Din Muhammad III, the penultimate Lord of the Alamut, was copied by other European writers and caught the imagination of many readers. However, the contemporary historian al-Juwayni — an avowed enemy of the Nizaris who accompanied the Mongol leader Hulagu to Alamut in 1256 and carefully inspected the fortress before its destruction — does not report discovering any "secret gardens of paradise" as claimed in Marco Polo's popular account. Even though al-Juwayni mentions that he selected many "choice books" from the famous Alamut library for his purposes, he burned the books that he did not like.

== See also ==
- Aga Khan
- Fatimids
- List of Ismaili imams

‘Alā’ ad-Dīn Muḥammad III of the Ahl al-Bayt Banu Hashim Clan of the Banu Quraish Born: 1211 C.E Died: 1255 C.E.
Regnal titles
Preceded by Jalālu-d-Dīn Ḥassan III	7th Ruler of Nizārī Ismā'īlī state and Commander of Alamut Castle; 1221–1255	Succeeded by Rukn-ud-Dīn Khurshāh
Shia Islam titles
Preceded by Jalālu-d-Dīn Ḥassan III	Imām ‘Alā’ ad-Dīn Muḥammad III; 26th Imām of Nizārī Ismā'īlīs; 1221–1255	Succeeded by Rukn-ud-Dīn Khurshāh
