= Yassa =

Secret written code of law created by Genghis Khan

The Yassa (alternatively Yasa, Yasaq, Jazag or Zasag; Mongolian: Их Засаг, romanized: Ikh Zasag) was the oral law code of the Mongols, gradually built up through the reign of Genghis Khan. It was the de facto law of the Mongol Empire, even though the "law" was kept secret and never made public. The Yassa seems to have its origin in wartime decrees, which were later codified and expanded to include cultural and lifestyle conventions. By keeping the Yassa secret, the decrees could be modified and used selectively. It is believed that the Yassa was supervised by Genghis Khan himself and his adopted son Shigi Qutuqu, then the high judge (in Mongolian: улсын их заргач) of the Mongol Empire. Genghis Khan appointed his second son, Chagatai (later Chagatai Khan), to oversee the laws' execution.

== Etymology ==
The word yasa (or Yassa) exists in both Mongolic and Turkic languages. It is believed that the word derives from the Proto-Mongolian verb *jasa- (Modern Mongolian: засах, romanized: zasakh), which means "to set in order". The Turkic verb yasa-, which means "to govern; to create", was borrowed from Mongolian.

In the earliest text in Mongolian, the Secret History of the Mongols, the word yassa seems to refer specifically to authoritative (military) decrees. Čerig žasa- (Middle Mongolian: 扯^{舌᠋}里_{克᠌} 札撒) - roughly equivalent to modern Mongolian: цэрэг засах - is a phrase commonly found in the Secret History that means "to set the soldiers in order", in the sense of rallying the soldiers before a battle. In modern Mongolian, the verb zasaglakh (засаглах) means "to govern".

Another word, which is sometimes equated with yassa, is yosun (Modern Mongolian: ёс, romanized: jos). This term refers, broadly, to rules deriving from tradition, including for example rules of etiquette. Early chroniclers from Europe and the Middle East oftentimes did not clearly distinguish between the two terms - sometimes for ideological reasons - resulting in sources that often contain a mixture of laws and customs.

=== Historical and current use ===
Jasagh during the Qing dynasty referred to native provincial governors in Mongolia. The local office (the Lifan Yuan) served as their court of the first instance, and included secretaries and other officials.

The supreme executive body of the present-day Mongolian government is called the Zasgiin gazar (Mongolian: засгийн газар), which means "the place of Zasag", i.e. "the place of order".

== History ==
=== Date and textual history ===
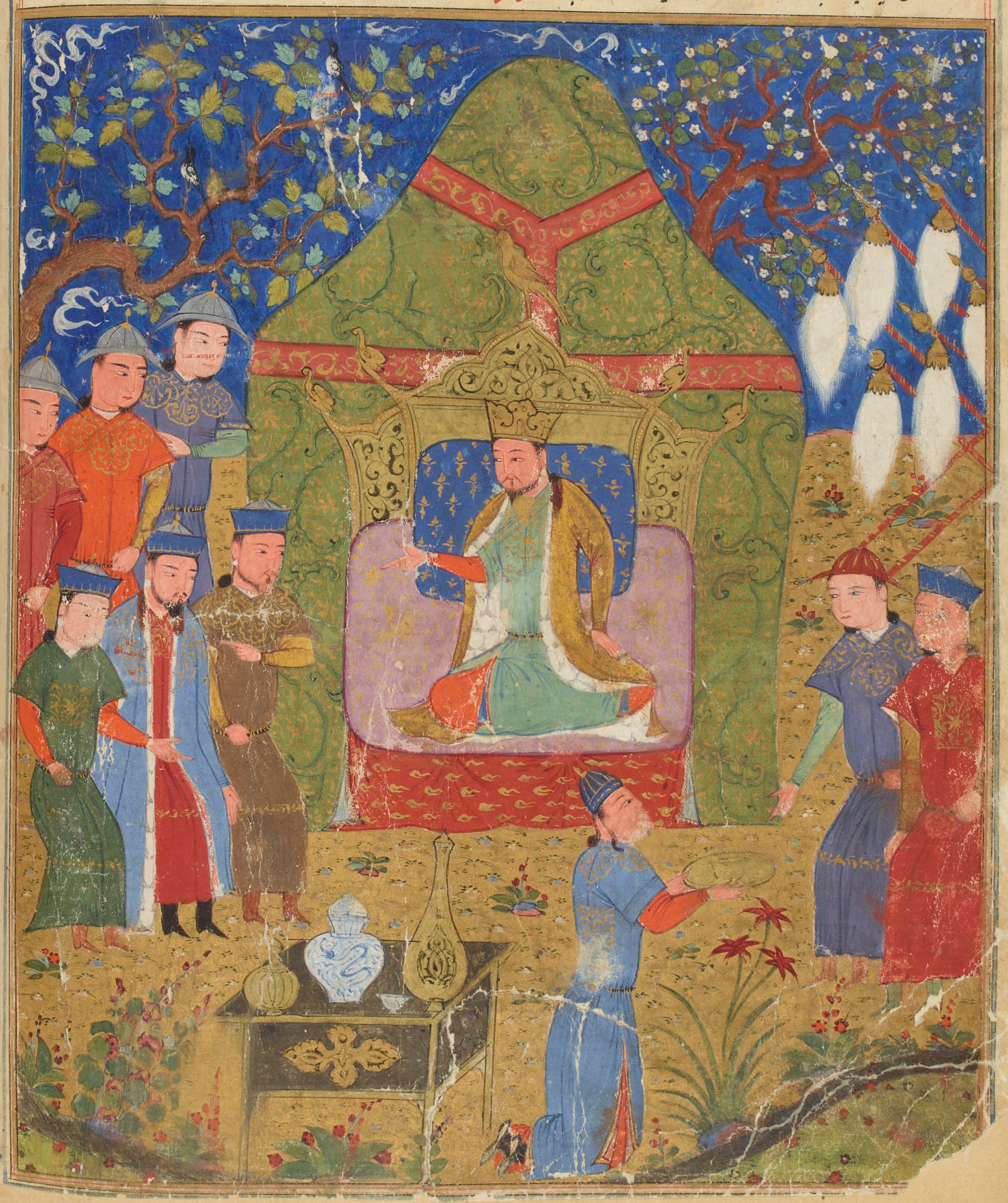
Temüjin being proclaimed as Genghis Khan, as illustrated in a 15th-century Jami' al-tawarikh manuscript.

According to some scholars, the Yassa was proclaimed by Genghis Khan at the kurultai of 1206, when he officially assumed the title of Genghis Khan. In the Secret History, Genghis Khan tells his adopted son Shigi Qutuqu to create a register of jurisprudence, which implies the existence of such a document:

"Furthermore, writing in a blue-script register all decisions about the distribution and about the judicial matters of the entire population, make it into a book. Until the offspring of my offspring, let no one alter any of the blue writing that Šigi Qutuqu, after deciding in accordance with me, shall make into a book with white paper. Anyone who alters it shall be guilty and liable to punishment."

The Yassa may have later been written down in the Uyghur script, preserved in secret archives and known only to and read only by the royal family. Juvyani, in the Tarikh-i Jahangushay, writes of the role of the yasas during a kurultai (a military council):

These rolls are called the Great book of the Yasas and are kept in the treasury of the chief princes. Whenever a khan ascends the throne, or a great army is mobilized, or the princes assemble and begin [to consult together] concerning affairs of state and the administration thereof, they produce these rolls and model their actions thereon;

The Yasa decrees were thought to be comprehensive and specific, but no Mongolian scroll or codex has been found. There are records of excerpts among many chronicles including those of al-Maqrizi, Vardan Areveltsi, and Ibn Battuta. The first of these may have relied on the work of Ata-Malik Juvayni, an Ilkhanate official. Moreover, copies may have been discovered in Korea as well.

In the end, the absence of any physical document is historically problematic. Historians are left with secondary sources, conjecture and speculation, which describe much of the content of the overview. Historical certainty about the Yassa is weak compared to the much older Code of Hammurabi (18th century BCE) or the Edicts of Ashoka (3rd century BCE). The latter was carved for all to see on stone plinths, 12 to 15 m high, which were located throughout Ashoka's empire (now India, Nepal, Pakistan and Afghanistan).

=== Among the successors of Genghis Khan ===
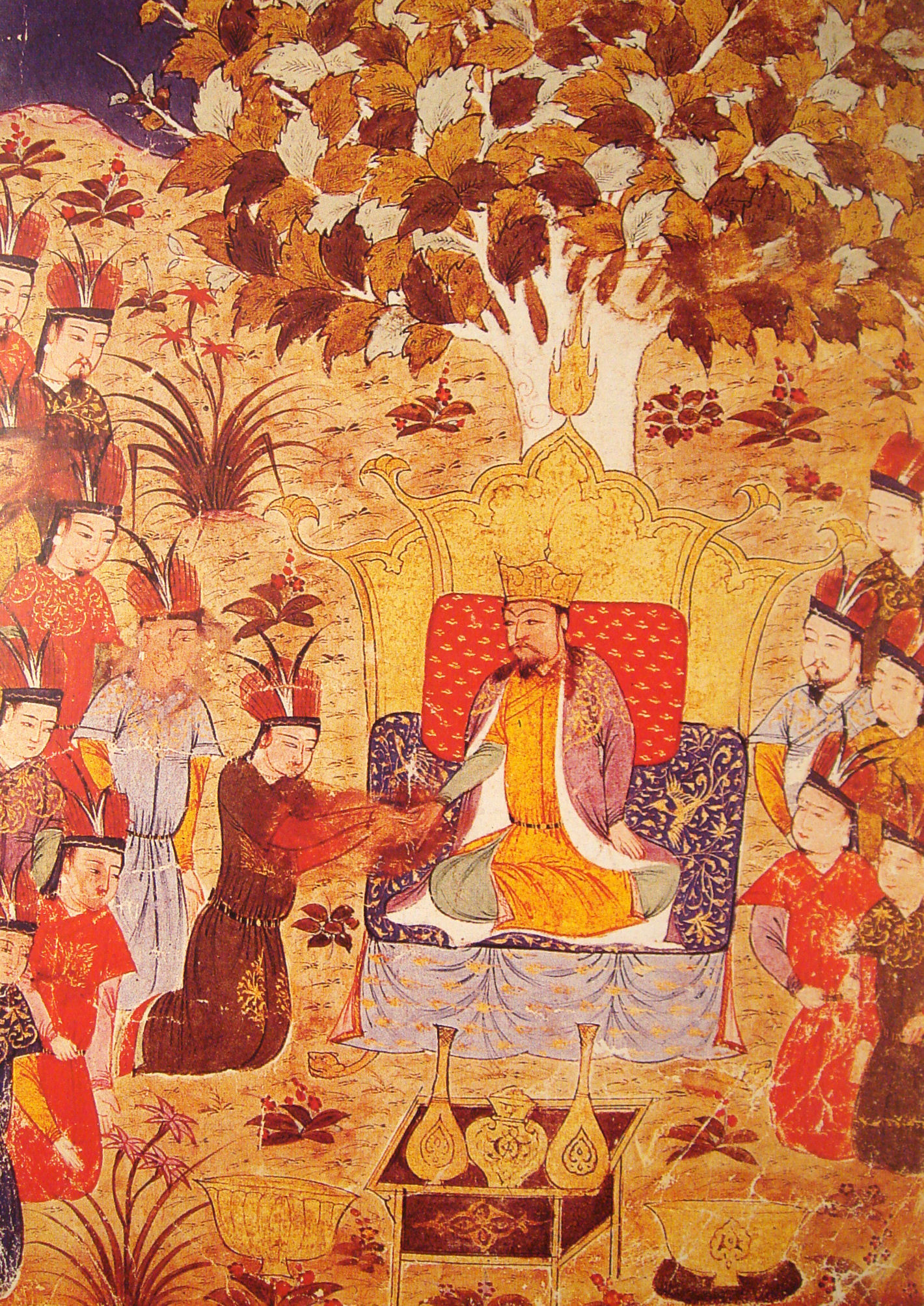
Coronation of Ögedei in 1229, by Rashid al-Din, early 14th century

Ögedei Khan, the third son of Genghis Khan and the second Great Khan, proclaimed the Great Yassa as an integral body of precedents at his coronation at the kurultai of 1229. He confirmed the continuing validity of his father's commands and ordinances, and added his own. Ögedei codified rules of dress, as well as the conduct of the kurultais. His two immediate successors followed the tradition of proclaiming the Yassa at their coronation.

The Mongols who lived in various parts of the empire began to add laws that were needed in their areas.

=== Present-day influence ===
In the modern Turkish language (as used presently in Turkey), the word for "law" is yasa, and the adjective "legal" is yasal. The word for a constitution, including the Constitution of Turkey, is Anayasa ("mother-law").

== Overview of contents ==
The contents of the Yassa are not known from one single document, but scholars have reconstructed their contents from numerous sources relating to them. Among these, of particular interest are of course the Secret History, but also the Tarikh-i Jahangushay of Juvyani, and other works by contemporaries. Most detailed non-Mongolian sources don't distinguish clearly between legal decrees (yassa) and customs (yosun).

=== Contents according to the Secret History ===
In the Secret History, Genghis Khan tells Shigi Qutuqu, his adopted son, to create a blue-script book, which may be one of the books that formed the basis for what was later understood as the Yassa. In this book, as Genghis tells Shigi Qutuqu, the following items should be collected:

"[all] decisions about the distribution and about the judicial matters of the entire population"

According to David Morgan, this amounts to: (1) "Matters pertaining to [the] division (...) of spoils and property"; and (2) "Matters pertaining to trials". Elsewhere in the Secret History, individual decrees of Genghis Khan are mentioned, but to what extent these should be understood as permanent laws is not always clear.

=== Contents according to the Tarikh-i Jahangushay ===
In the Tarikh-i Jahangushay, a work by the Ilkhanate official Ata-Malik Juvyani, there appears one chapter dedicated to commenting on the yassas. This chapter is by no means comprehensive, as stated by the author himself:

There are many other [yassas] to record each of which would delay us too long; we have therefore limited ourselves to the mention of the above.

However, some of the organisational matters discussed by Juvyani match pretty well with the brief statement in the Secret History about the contents of Shigi Qutuqu's blue-script book. He mentions both matters of tax, provisions and the divvying up of spoils, as well as punishable offences, most of which appear to apply specifically to the peasantry that made up the army.

On the one hand, for example, he states that there is a requirement to share food with travelers, a rule of selling women from other families, and a duty to maintain provisions for the ǰamči's (post stations). On the other hand, he paints a picture of strict army discipline, mentioning a ban on defection for soldiers, with the alleged punishment being summary public execution of the defector, and severe punishment for whoever offers shelter to the defector.

Throughout the rest of the work, Juvyani also mentions individual yassas, sometimes specifically ascribing them to Genghis Khan or his successors, and sometimes without further specification.

=== Further conjectured laws ===
The exoteric aspect of Yassa outlined laws for various members of the Mongol community such as soldiers, officers and doctors. The Yassa aimed at three things: obedience to Genghis Khan, a binding together of the nomad clans and the merciless punishment of wrongdoing. It concerned itself with people, not property. Unless a man confessed, he was not judged guilty. The purpose of many decrees was probably to eliminate social and economic disputes among the Mongols and future allied peoples. Among the rules were the ban on cattle raiding. It represented a day-to-day set of rules for people under Mongol control that was strictly enforced.

The Yassa also addressed and reflected Mongol cultural and lifestyle norms. Death via decapitation was the most common punishment unless the offender was of noble blood, when the offender would be killed by way of back-breaking, without shedding blood. Even minor offences were punishable by death. For example, a soldier would be put to death if he did not pick up something that fell from the person in front of him. Those favored by the Khan were often given preferential treatment within the system of law and were allowed several chances before they were punished.

As Genghis Khan had set up an institution that ensured complete religious freedom, people under his rule were free to worship as they pleased if the laws of the Yassa were observed.

== See also ==
- Legal history
- Tarikh-i Jahangushay
- Three Rules of Discipline and Eight Points for Attention

== Bibliography ==
=== Ancient sources ===
- Blake, Robert P.; Frye, Richard N. (1949). "History of the Nation of the Archers (The Mongols) by Grigor of Akancʻ; Hitherto Ascribed to Matakʻia The Monk: The Armenian Text Edited with an English Translation and Notes". Harvard Journal of Asiatic Studies. 12 (3–4): 269–443. doi:10.2307/2718096. JSTOR 2718096.
- Bar Hebraeus (Abul-Faraj) [13th century AD]. Makhtbhanuth Zabhne (Chronicon) (vol. 2: Chronicon Ecclesiasticum) - The current edition of the Chronicon Ecclesiasticum is by Jean Baptiste Abbeloos and Thomas Joseph Lamy, Syriac text, Latin translation.
- Gibb, H.A.R., ed. (1958), The Travels of Ibn Baṭṭūṭa, A.D. 1325–1354 (Volume 1), London: Hakluyt Society.
- Gibb, H.A.R., ed. (1962), The Travels of Ibn Baṭṭūṭa, A.D. 1325–1354 (Volume 2), London: Hakluyt Society.
- Gibb, H.A.R., ed. (1971), The Travels of Ibn Baṭṭūṭa, A.D. 1325–1354 (Volume 3), London: Hakluyt Society.
- Gibb, H.A.R.; Beckingham, C.F., eds. (1994), The Travels of Ibn Baṭṭūṭa, A.D. 1325–1354 (Volume 4), London: Hakluyt Society, ISBN 978-0-904180-37-4. This volume was translated by Beckingham after Gibb's death in 1971. A separate index was published in 2000.
- Vardan Areveltsi [13th century AD]. Havakumn Patmutyun (Historical Compilation). Currently preserved at the Matenadaran in Yerevan, Armenia.
- Rashīd al-Dīn Ṭabīb [c. 1306-1311 AD]. Jami' al-tawarikh (Compendium of Chronicles).
- Ata-Malik Juvayni [13th century AD]. Tarikh-i Jahangushay (History of the World Conqueror).
- Mirkhvand [c.1497 AD]. Rawżat aṣ-ṣafāʾ (The Gardens of purity in the biography of the prophets and kings and caliphs). Eng. trans. begun as History of the Early Kings of Persia, 1832.
- al-Maqrizi [c. 1442 AD]. Kitāb al-Sulūk li-Ma'rifat Duwal al-Mulūk (The History of the Ayyubit and Mameluke Rulers). Translated (into French) by E. Quatremére (2 vols. Paris, 1837–1845)

=== Modern sources ===
- Aigle, Denise (2004). "Mongolian Law versus Islamic Law: Between Myth and Reality". Annales. Histoire, Sciences Sociales (in French). 59 (5): 971–996. ISSN 2268-3763.
- Ayalon, David (1971). "The Great Yāsa of Chingiz Khān. A Reexamination (Part A)". Studia Islamica (33): 97–140. doi:10.2307/1595029. ISSN 0585-5292. JSTOR 1595029.
- Lamb, Harold (1927). Genghis Khan: The Emperor of All Men. Garden City Publishing.
- Morgan, David O. (2005). "The "Great Yasa of Chinggis Khan" Revisited". Mongols, Turks, and Others. Brill. pp. 291–308. ISBN 978-90-474-0633-4.
- Vernadsky, George (1938). "The Scope and Content of Chingis Khan's Yasa". Harvard Journal of Asiatic Studies. 3 (3/4): 337–360. doi:10.2307/2717841. JSTOR 2717841.
- Vernadsky, George (1953). The Mongols and Russia. Yale University Press. p. 102.
