= Alamut Castle =

UNESCO World Heritage Site in Iran

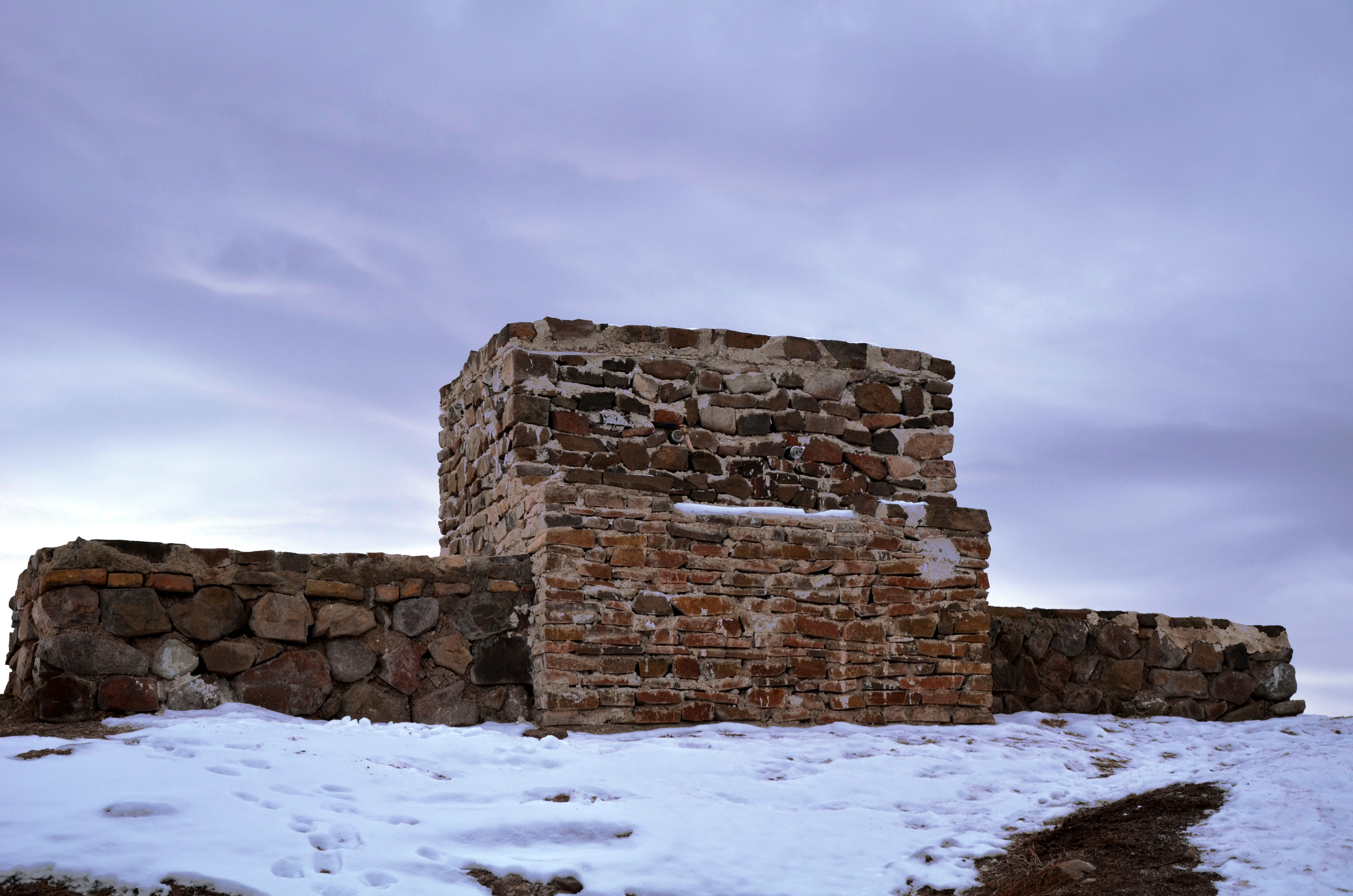
- Remains of the Alamut Castle in Qazvin, Iran

- Location within Iran

General information
- Type: Castle
- Architectural style: Iranian
- Location: Alamut region, Qazvin Province of Iran (Historically also: Tabaristan), Moallem Kalayeh, Iran
- Coordinates: 36°26′41″N 50°35′10″E
- Completed: 865
- Destroyed: 1256

UNESCO World Heritage Site
- Official name: Alamūt Castle
- Part of: Alamūt Castle and Related Fortifications
- Criteria: Cultural: iii
- Reference: 1770
- Inscription: 2026 (48th Session)

Alamut (Persian: الموت, lit. 'Eagle's Nest') is a ruined mountain fortress located in the Alamut region in the South Caspian, near the village of Gazor Khan in Qazvin province in Iran, approximately 200 km (130 mi) from Tehran.

In 1090 AD, the Alamut Castle, a mountain fortress in Iran, came into the possession of Hassan-i Sabbah, a champion of the Nizari Ismaili cause. Until 1256, Alamut functioned as the headquarters of the Nizari Ismaili state, which included a series of strategic strongholds scattered throughout Persia and Syria, with each stronghold being surrounded by swathes of hostile territory.

Alamut, which is the most famous of these strongholds, was thought impregnable to any military attack and was fabled for its heavenly gardens, library, and laboratories where philosophers, scientists and theologians could debate in intellectual freedom.

The stronghold survived adversaries including the Seljuk and Khwarazmian empires. In 1256, Rukn al-Din Khurshah surrendered the fortress to the invading Mongols, who dismantled it and destroyed its famous library holdings. Though commonly assumed that the Mongol conquest obliterated the Nizari Ismailis presence at Alamut, the fortress was recaptured in 1275 by Nizari forces, demonstrating that while the destruction and damage to the Ismailis in that region was extensive, it was not the complete annihilation attempted by the Mongols. However, the castle was seized once again and fell under the rule of Hulegu Khan’s eldest son in 1282. Afterward, the castle was of only regional significance, passing through the hands of various local powers. Nowadays, it lies in ruins.

In July 2026, the Alamut Castle and Related Fortifications were inscribed on the UNESCO World Heritage List under criterion (iii), as a rare testimony to the cultural tradition of the Nizari Isma'ilis. The inscription covers Alamut Castle and six associated fortifications: Lambesar, Navizaršāh, Šams Kelāyeh, Qosṭinlār, Širkūh, and Ilān. The inscription followed more than two decades of archaeological research, conservation, and documentation in the Alamut region, in which Iranian archaeologist Hamideh Choubak played a leading role as the longtime supervisor of archaeological investigations at the site.

== Origins and name ==
"Alamut" was the name of the castle until 1090, and afterwards it was called "Hassan Sabbah's Castle" (قلعه حسن صباح). According to local narrations, the castle was original named after the nearby village of Gazor Khan (Qasir Khan).

Popular local belief trace the foundation of the castle to the mythologicl Iranian king Keyumars, which maybe the result of confusion with a namesake Baduspanid ruler (r. 1395-1410) who briefly ruled over the castle.

The Alamut castle was built by the Justanid ruler of Daylam, Wahsūdān ibn Marzubān, a follower of Zaydi Shi'ism, around 840 AD. During a hunting trip, he witnessed a soaring eagle perch high on a rock. Realizing the tactical advantage of this location, he chose the site for the construction of a fortress, which was called Aluh āmū[kh]t (اله آموت) by the natives, likely meaning "Eagle's Teaching" or "Nest of Punishment". The abjad numerical value of this word is 483, which is the date of the castle's capture by Hassan-i Sabbah (483 AH = 1090/91 AD). Alamut remained under Justanid control until the arrival of the Isma'ili chief da’i (missionary) Hassan-i Sabbah to the castle in 1090 AD, marking the start of the Alamut period in Nizari Isma'ili history.

During the Ismaili period, the castle had nicknames at different times, such as the "Land of Good Fortune" (بلدة الاقبال, named after the unexpected failure of the first Seljuk siege), Dar-ul-Mulk-i Ism'ailiyan (دارالملک اسماعیلیان), Kursi-yi Daylam (کرسی دیلم), and the "Throne of Daylaman" (تخت دیلمان). The opponents used other nicknames, such as the "The House of Heretics in Rudbar of Alamut" (الحادخانۀ رودبار الموت Ilhad-khana-ye Rudbar-i Alamut) and the "Lock of Satan" (قفل ابلیس Qufl-i Ilbis).

== List of Nizari Isma'ili rulers at Alamut (1090–1256) ==
Nizari da'is who ruled at Alamut

1. Hassan-i Sabbah (حسن صباح) (1050–1124)
2. Kiya Buzurg-Ummid (کیا بزرگ امید) (1124–1138)
3. Muhammad ibn Kiya Buzurg-Ummid (محمد بزرگ امید) (1138–1162)

Imams in occultation at Alamut

1. Ali al-Hadi ibn Nizar ibn al-Mustansir
2. Muhammad (I) al-Muhtadi
3. Hasan (I) al-Qahir

Imams who ruled at Alamut

1. Hasan (II) Ala Dhikrihi al-Salam (امام حسن علی ذکره السلام) (1162–1166)
2. Nur al-Din Muhammad (II) (امام نور الدین محمد) (1166–1210)
3. Jalal al-Din Hasan (III) (امام جلال الدین حسن) (1210–1221)
4. Al al-Din Muhammad (III) (امام علاء الدین محمد) (1221–1255)
5. Rukn al-Din Khurshah (امام رکن الدین خورشاه) (1255–1256)

== History ==
Following his expulsion from Egypt over his support for Nizar ibn al-Mustansir, Hassan-i Sabbah found that his co-religionists, the Isma'ilis, were scattered throughout Persia, with a strong presence in the northern and eastern regions, particularly in Daylaman, Khorasan and Quhistan. The Ismailis and other occupied peoples of Iran held shared resentment for the ruling Seljuks, who had divided the country's farmland into iqtā’ (fiefs) and levied heavy taxes upon the citizens living therein. The Seljuq amirs (independent rulers) usually held full jurisdiction and control over the districts they administered. Meanwhile, Persian artisans, craftsmen and lower classes grew increasingly dissatisfied with the Seljuq policies and heavy taxes. Hassan too, was appalled by the political and economic oppression imposed by the Sunni Seljuq ruling class on Shi'i Muslims living across Iran.

=== Capture of Alamut ===
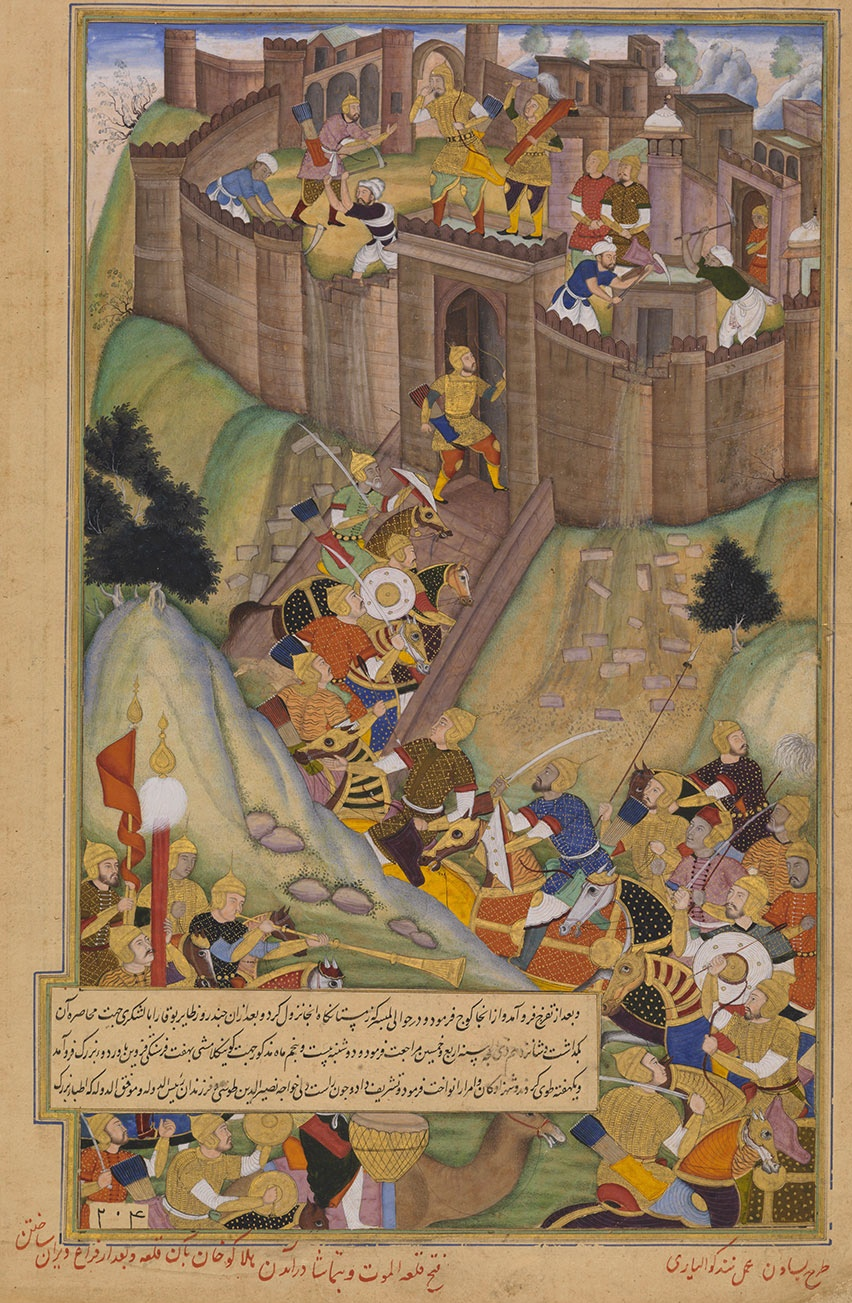
Capture of the Alamut, 16th-century Mughal miniature

By 1090, the Seljuq vizier Nizam al-Mulk had already given orders for Hassan's arrest and therefore Hassan was living in hiding in the northern town of Qazvin, approximately 60 km from the Alamut castle. There, he made plans for the capture of the fortress, which was surrounded by a fertile valley whose inhabitants were mainly fellow Shi’i Muslims, the support of whom Hassan could easily gather for the revolt against the Seljuqs. The castle had never before been captured by military means and thus Hassan planned meticulously.

In the summer of 1090, Hassan set out from Qazvin towards Alamut on a mountainous route through Andej. He remained at Andej disguised as a schoolteacher named Dehkhoda until he was certain that a number of his supporters had settled directly below the castle in the village of Gazorkhan or had gained employment at the fortress itself. Still in disguise, Hassan made his way into the fortress, earning the trust and friendship of many of its soldiers. Careful not to attract the attention of the castle's Zaydi ‘Alid lord, Mahdi, Hassan began to attract prominent figures at Alamut to his mission. It has even been suggested that Mahdi's own deputy was a secret supporter of Hassan, waiting to demonstrate his loyalty on the day that Hassan would ultimately take the castle.

Earlier in the summer, Mahdi visited Qazvin, where he received strict orders from Nizam al-Mulk to find and arrest Hassan who was said to be hiding in the province of Daylaman. Upon his return to the Alamut fortress, Mahdi noticed several new servants and guards employed there. His deputy explained that illness had taken many of the castle's workers and it was fortunate that other labourers were found from the neighbouring villages. Worried about the associations of these workers, Mahdi ordered his deputy to arrest anyone with connections to the Ismailis.

Mahdi's suspicions were confirmed when Hassan finally approached the lord of the fortress, revealing his true identity and declared that the castle now belonged to him. Immediately, Mahdi called upon the guards to arrest and remove Hassan from the castle, only to find them prepared to follow Hassan's every command. Astounded, he realized he had been tricked and was allowed to exit the castle freely. Before leaving however, Mahdi was given a draft of 3000 gold dinars as payment for the fortress, payable by a Seljuq officer in service to the Isma'ili cause named Ra’is Muzaffar who honoured the payment in full. The Alamut fortress was captured from Mahdi and therefore from Seljuq control by Hassan and his supporters without resorting to any violence.

=== Construction and intellectual development ===
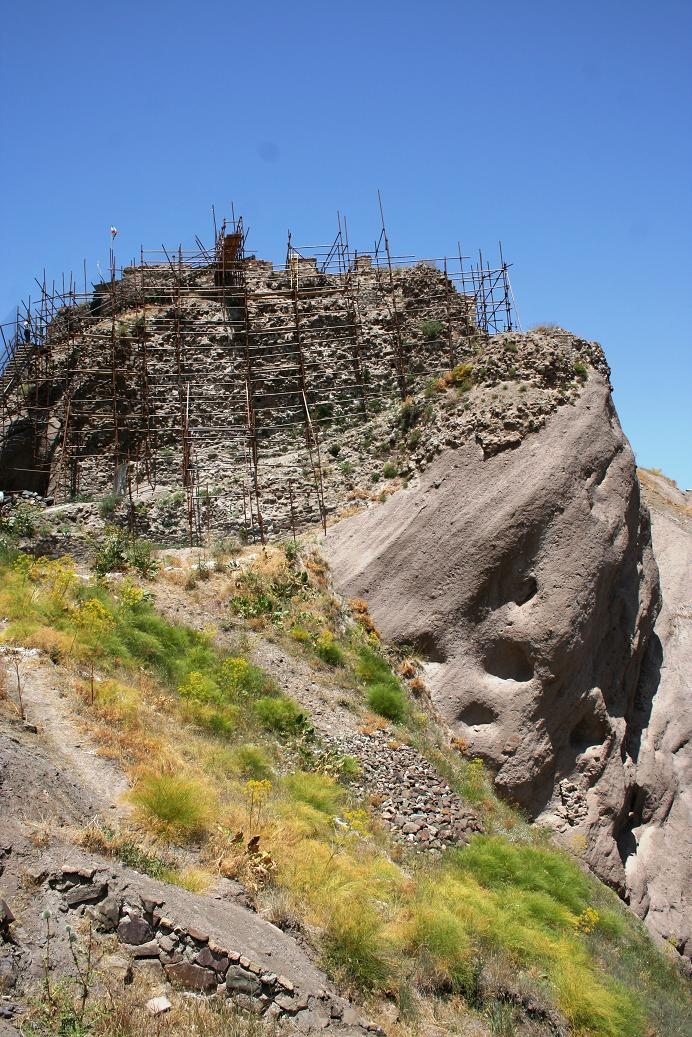
Scaffolding by Iran's Cultural Heritage Organization.

With Alamut now in his possession, Hassan swiftly embarked on a complete re-fortification of the complex. By enhancing the walls and structure of a series of storage facilities, the fortress was to act as a self-sustaining stronghold during major confrontations. The perimeters of the rooms were lined with limestone, so as to preserve provisions to be used in times of crisis. Indeed, when the Mongols invaded the fortress, Juvayni was astonished to see stored countless supplies in perfect condition to withstand a possible siege.

Next, Hassan took on the task of irrigating the surrounding villages of the Alamut valley. The land at valley's floor was arable land, allowing for the cultivation of dry crops including barley, wheat and rice. In order to make available the maximum amount of cultivable land, the ground was terraced under Hassan's direction.

The construction of Alamut's famous library likely occurred after Hassan's fortification of the castle and its surrounding valley. With its astronomical instruments and rare collection of works, the library attracted scholars and scientists of a variety of religious persuasions from around the world who visited it for many months at a time, hosted by the Isma'ilis. By and large the writings of the Persian Ismailis, both scientific and doctrinal, did not survive beyond the Alamut period. In addition to the rich literature they had already produced in Arabic, the relocation of the Ismaili center to Iran now prompted a surge in Persian Ismaili literature.

One of the earliest losses of the library came during the early years of the Imam Jalal al-Din Hasan’s leadership at Alamut. In keeping with his principles of bridging the gaping relations between the Persian Ismailis and the broader Sunni world, Imam Jalal al-Din Hasan invited a number of religious scholars from the town of Qazvin to visit the castle's library and burn any books they deemed heretical. However, it was not until under the direction of the Mongol ruler, Hulegu Khan, when the Mongols ascended to the fortress in December 1256, that the Alamut library was lost. With the permission of Hulegu, Juvayni explored the library and selected a few works he deemed worthy of salvaging, before the remainder was set aflame. His choice items included copies of the Qur'an, a number of astronomical instruments and treatises, and a number of Ismaili works. An anti-Ismaili, Ata-Malik Juvayni's personal leanings were the sole measure of heretical content of the library's doctrinal works. Thus, some of the richest treatises regarding the tenets of Ismaili faith were lost with his destruction of the library. From his tour and survey of the castle, Juvayni compiled a description of Alamut that he incorporated into his chronicle of the Mongol invasions, entitled Tarikh-i Jahangushay-i Juvaini ("The History of the World Conqueror").

=== Concealment and emergence: Imamat at Alamut ===
With the death of Hassan-i Sabbah in 1124, the Alamut fortress was now in the command of the da’i Kiya Buzurg Ummid, under whose direction Ismaili-Seljuq relations improved. However, this was not without a test of the strength of Buzurg Ummid's command, and consequently the Seljuks began an offensive in 1126 on the Isma'ili strongholds of Rudbar and Quhistan. Only after these assaults failed did the Seljuq sultan Ahmad Sanjar concede to recognise the independence of the Isma'ili territories.

=== Muhammad ibn Kiya Buzurg ===
Accordingly, Muḥammad succeeded Kiya Buzurg Ummid in 1138. Though they expected some resistance to his rule, the fragmented Seljuks were met with continued solidarity amongst the Ismailis, who remained unified under Muhammad's command. The early part of Muhammad's rule saw a continued low level of conflict, enabling the Nizaris to acquire and construct a number of fortresses in the Qumis and Rudbar regions, including the castles of Sa’adat-kuh, Mubarak-kuh, and Firuz-kuh.

=== Imam Hasan ‘ala Dhikrihi al-Salam ===
Taken by illness in 1162, Muhammad was succeeded by Hasan, who was then about thirty-five years of age. Only two years after his accession, the Imam Hasan, apparently conducted a ceremony known as qiyama (resurrection) at the grounds of the castle of Alamut, whereby the Imam would once again become visible to his community of followers in and outside of the Nizārī Ismā'īlī state. Given Juvayni's polemical aims, and the fact that he burned the Ismā'īlī libraries which may have offered much more reliable testimony about the history, scholars have been dubious about his narrative but are forced to rely on it given the absence of alternative sources. Fortunately, descriptions of this event are also preserved in Rashid al-Din’s narrative and recounted in the Haft Bab-i Abi Ishaq, an Ismaili book of the 15th century. However, these are either based on Juvayni, or don't go into great detail. No contemporary Ismaili account of the events has survived.

=== Ismaili version of the Alamut history ===
What little we know about the Imamate at Alamut is narrated to us by one of the greatest detractors of the Ismailis, Juvayni. A Sunni Muslim scholar, Juvayni was serving Mongol patrons. While he then could not openly celebrate the Mongol victories over other Muslim rulers, the Mongol victory over the Nizari Ismailis, who Juvayni considered heretics and “as vile as dogs” became the focus of his work about Mongol invasions.

According to the Ismaili version of the events, in the year following the death of the Imam-Caliph al-Mustansir, a qadi (judge) by the name of Abul Hasan Sa'idi travelled from Egypt to Alamut, taking with him Imam Nizar’s youngest son, who was known as al-Hadi.

=== Imam Nur al-Din Muhammad ===
Succeeding Hasan 'ala dhikri al-salam in 1166, was the Imam Nūr al-Dīn Muhammad II, who, like his father and the imams of the pre-Alamut period, openly declared himself to his followers.

=== Imam Jalal al-Din Hasan ===
Within Persia, the Nizaris of the qiyama period largely disregarded their former political endeavours and became considerably isolated from the surrounding Sunni world. The death of Muhammad II however, ushered in a new era for the Nizaris, under the direction of the next Imam Jalal al-din Hasan. Imam Jalal al-Din Hasan invited Sunni scholars and jurists from across Khurasan and Iraq to visit Alamut, and even invited them to inspect the library and remove any books they found to be objectionable. During his lifetime, the Imam Jalal al-Din Hasan maintained friendly relations with the `Abbasid Caliph al-Nasir. An alliance with the caliph of Baghdad meant greater resources for the self-defence of not only the Nizari Ismaili state, but also the broader Muslim world.

=== Imam Ala al-Din Muhammad ===
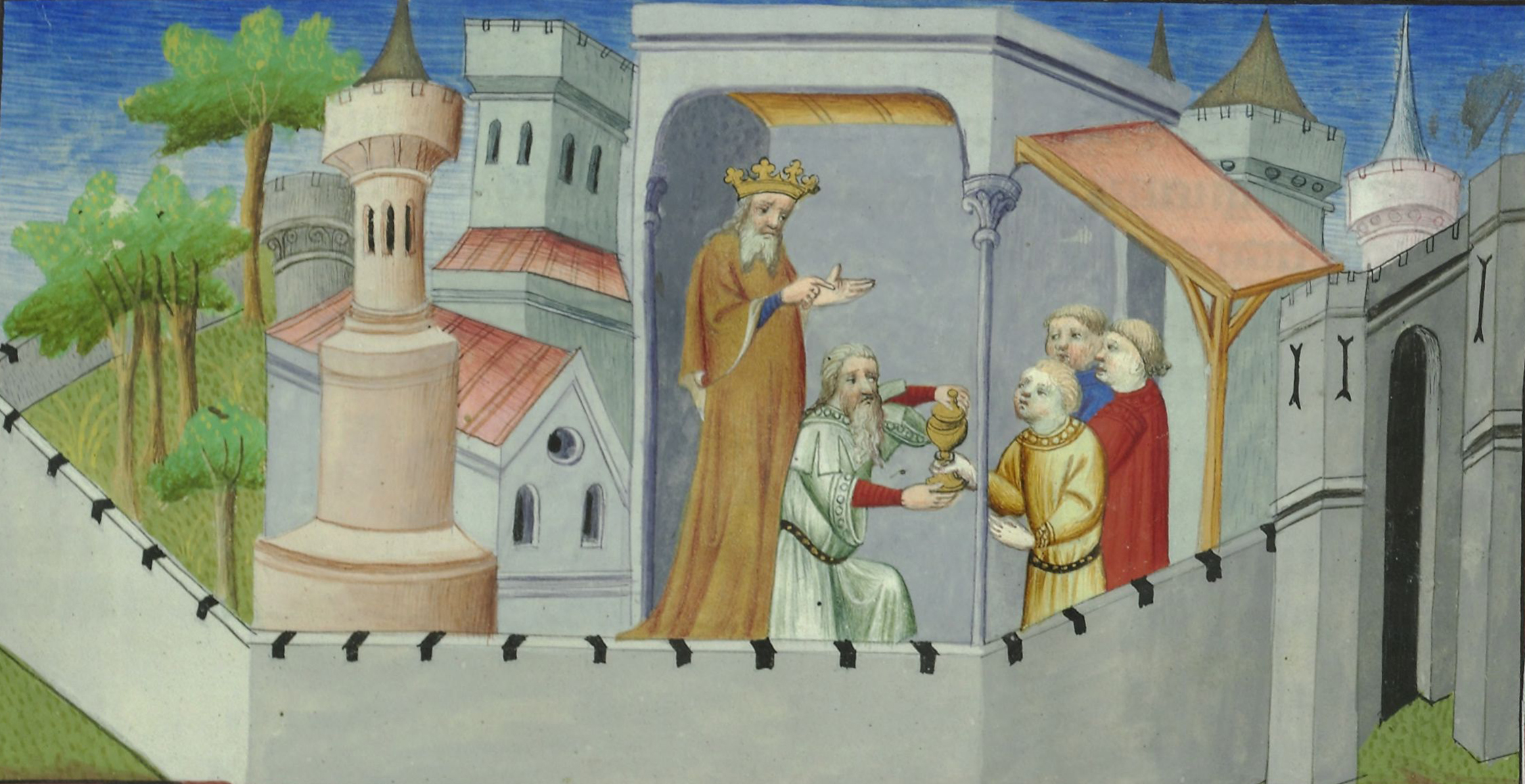
The 26th Nizari Ismaili Imam Ala al-Din Muhammad depicted in The Travels of Marco Polo. (Bibliothèque nationale de France)

After his death in 1221, Imam Jalal al-Din Hasan was succeeded by his son ‘Ala al-Din Muhammad. Ascending to the throne at only nine years of age, Imam 'Ala al-Din Muhammad continued his father's policy of maintaining close relations with the Abbasid caliph. Under the leadership of Imam 'Ala al-Din Muhammad, the need for an Imam to constantly guide the community according to the demands of the times was emphasized. Intellectual life and scholarship flourished under the rule of Imam 'Ala al-Din Muhammad. The Nizari libraries were invigorated with scholars from across Asia, fleeing from the invading Mongols.

=== Imam Rukn al-Din Khurshah ===
By the time of Imam 'Ala al-Din Muhammad's murder in 1255, the Mongols had already attacked a number of the Ismaili strongholds in Quhistan. Imam 'Ala al-Din Muhammad was succeeded by his eldest son Imam Rukn al-Din Khurshah who engaged in a long series of negotiations with invading Mongols, and under whose leadership, the Alamut castle was surrendered to the Mongols.

=== The Mongol invasion and collapse of the Nizari Ismaili state ===
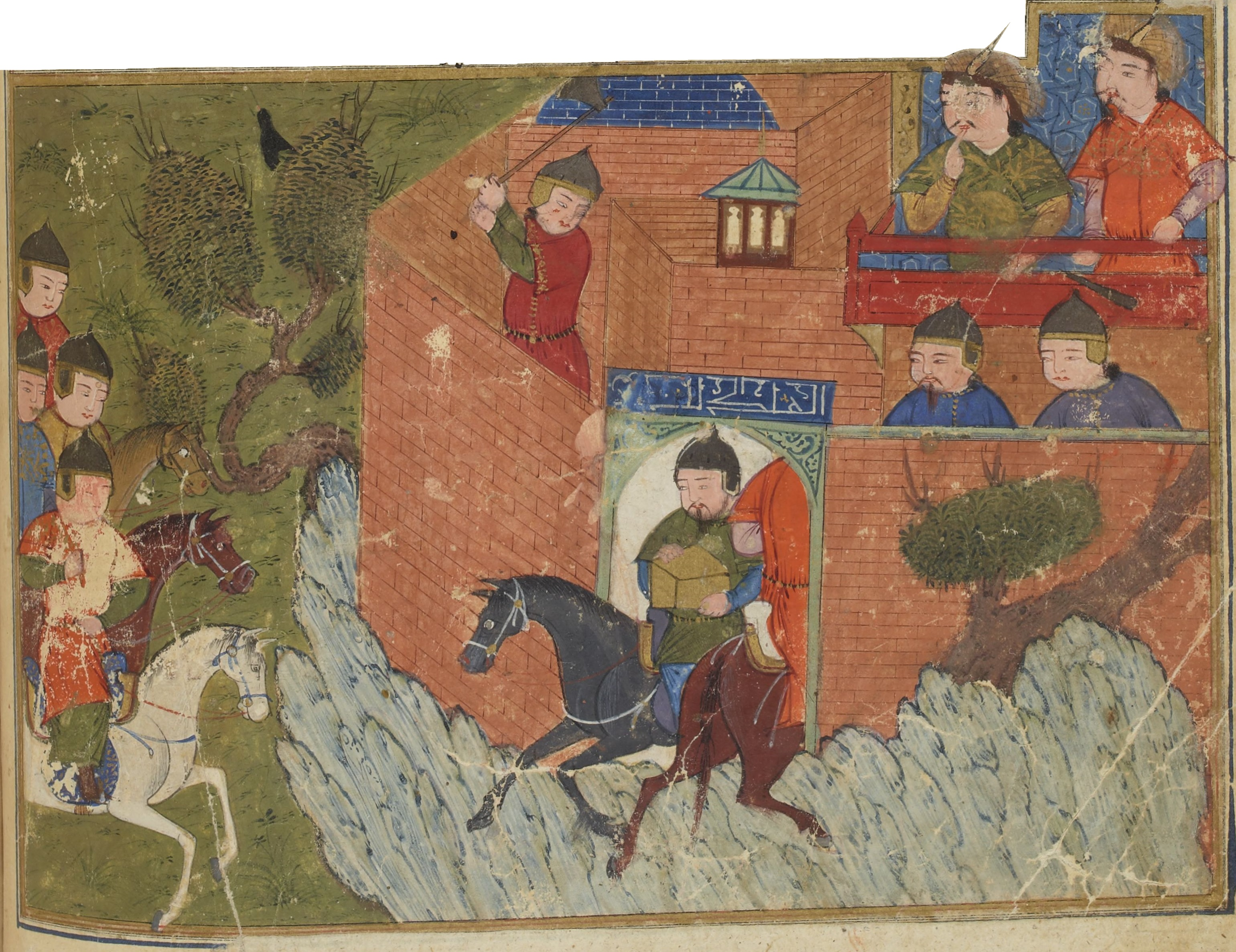
Siege of Alamut (1256), depicted in the Jami' al-tawarikh by Rashid-al-Din Hamadani Bibliothèque Nationale de France, Département des Manuscrits, Division Orientale.

The expansion of Mongol power across Western Asia depended upon the conquest of the Islamic lands, the complete seizure of which would be impossible without dismantling the ardent Nizari Ismaili state.

The first Mongol attack on the Ismailis came in April 1253, when many of the Quhistani fortresses were lost to the Christian Mongol general Ket-Buqa. By May, the Mongol troops had proceeded to the fortress of Girdkuh where Ismaili forces held ground for several months. In December, a cholera outbreak within the castle weakened the Ismaili defences. Reinforcements quickly arrived from the neighbouring Alamut fortress and thwarted the attacking Mongols, killing several hundred of Ket-Buqa's troops. The castle was saved but the subsequent Mongol assaults on the towns of Tun and Tus resulted in massacres. Across Khurasan the Mongols imposed tyrannical laws and were responsible for the mass displacement of the province's population.

After the massacres at Tun in 1256, Hulegu became directly involved in the Mongol campaign to eliminate the Ismaili centres of power. From a lavish tent erected for him at Tus, Hulegu summoned the Ismaili governor at Quhistan, Nasir al-Din Muhtasham and demanded the surrender of all fortresses in his province. Nasir al-Din explained that submission could only come at the Imam's orders and that he, as governor, was powerless to seek the Ismailis' compliance.

Meanwhile, Imam ‘Ala al-Din Mohammad, who had been murdered, was succeeded by his son Rukn al-Din Khurshah in 1255. In 1256, Rukn al-Din commenced a series of gestures demonstrating his submission to the Mongols. In a show of his compliance and at the demand of Hulegu, Rukn al-Din began the dismantling process at Alamut, Maymundiz and Lamasar, removing towers and battlements. However, as winter approached, Hulegu took these gestures to be a means of delaying his seizure of the castles and on November 8, 1256, the Mongol troops quickly encircled the Maymundiz fortress and residence of the Imam. After four days of preliminary bombardment with significant casualties for both sides, the Mongols assembled their mangonels around the castle in preparation for a direct siege. There was still no snow on the ground and the attacks proceeded, forcing Rukn al-Din to declare his surrender in exchange for his and his family's safe passage.

In the hands of Hulegu, Rukn al-Din was forced to send the message of surrender to all the castles in the Alamut valley. At the Alamut fortress, the Mongol Prince Balaghai led his troops to the base of the castle, calling for the surrender of the commander of Alamut, Muqaddam al-Din. It was decreed that should he surrender and pledge his allegiance to the Great Khan within one day, the lives of those at Alamut would be spared. Maymundiz was reluctant and wondered if the Imam's message of surrender was an actually act of duress. In obedience to the Imam, Muqaddam and his men descended from the fortress, and the Mongol army entered Alamut and began its demolition. Compared with Maymundiz, the Alamut fortress was far better fortified and could have long withstood the assaults of the Mongol army. However, the castle was relatively small in size and was easily surrounded by the Mongols. Still, the most significant factor in determining the defeat of the Ismailis at Alamut was the command by the Imam for the surrender of the castles in the valley. Many of the other fortresses had already complied, therefore not only would Muqaddam's resistance have resulted in a direct battle for the castle, but the explicit violation of the instructions of the Imam, which would impact significantly on the Ismaili commander's oath of total obedience to the Imam.

The conquest of the Ismaili castles was critical to the Mongol's political and territorial expansion westward. However, it was depicted by Juvayni as a "matter of divine punishment upon the heretics [at] the nest of Satan". Juvayni's depiction of the fall of the Nizari Ismaili state reveals the religious leanings of the anti-Ismaili historian. When Rukn al-Din arrived in Mongolia with promises to persuade the prevailing Ismaili fortresses to surrender, the Great Khan Mongke no longer believed the Imam to be of use. En route back to his homeland, Rukn al-Din was put to death. In his description of this, Juvayni concludes that the Imam's murder cleansed "the world which had been polluted by their evil". Subsequently, in Quhistan, the Ismailis were called by thousands to attend large gatherings, where they were massacred. While some escaped to neighbouring regions, the Ismailis who perished in the massacres following the capture of the Ismaili garrisons numbered nearly 100,000.

According to Ata-Malik Juvayni during the assault on the Alamut fort, "Khitayan" built siege weapons resembling crossbows were used. "Khitayan" meant Chinese and it was a type of arcuballista, deployed in 1256 under Hulagu's command. Stones were knocked off the castle and the bolts "burnt" a great number of the Assassins. They could fire a distance around 2,500 paces. The device was described as an ox's bow. Pitch which was lit on fire was applied to the bolts of the weapon before firing. Another historian thinks that instead gunpowder might have been strapped onto the bolts which caused the burns during the battle recorded by Juvayini.

=== After the Mongol invasion ===
It was assumed that with the initial siege of the Alamut Castle in 1256 the Nizari Ismaili presence in the area would have been obliterated. Though the damage was extensive, Nizari forces were able to recapture the Castle in 1275.

Evidence of another wave of destruction in the Safavid period has been found by archaeological studies in 2004 led by Hamideh Chubak. Further evidence suggests another Afghan attack on the castle.

== Construction and features ==
The castle reportedly had secret entrances that are destroyed or blocked today. The castle was connected with other castles in the region via secret tunnels.

Ceramic pipes (Tanbusheh) was used to supply the castle with water from nearby mountains. Milk was supplied using the same method from Gav-Dushan (گاودوشان), a place near the higher mountain Kuh-e Shatan. The castle was additionally equipped with water storage areas.

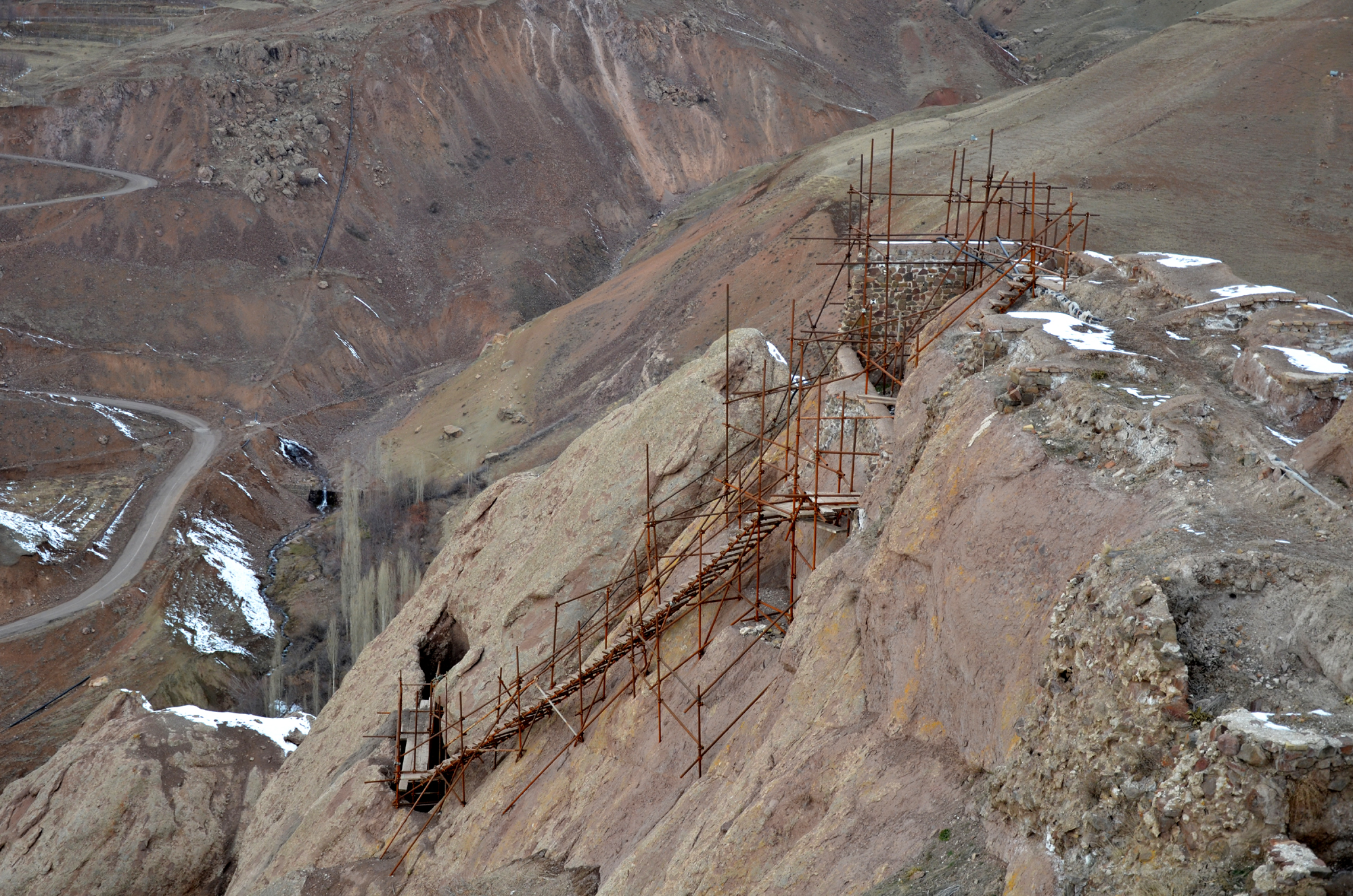
View of the Alamut Castle

The natural geographical features of the valley surrounding Alamut largely secured the castle's defence. Positioned atop a narrow rock base approximately 180 m above ground level, the fortress could not be taken by direct military force. To the east, the Alamut valley is bordered by a mountainous range called Alamkuh (The Throne of Solomon) between which the Alamut River flows. The valley's western entrance is a narrow one, shielded by cliffs over 350 m high. Known as the Shirkuh, the gorge sits at the intersection of three rivers: the Taliqan, Shahrud and Alamut River. For much of the year, the raging waters of the river made this entrance nearly inaccessible. Qazvin, the closest town to the valley by land can only be reached by an underdeveloped mule track upon which an enemy's presence could easily be detected given the dust clouds arising from their passage.

The military approach of the Nizari Ismaili state was largely a defensive one, with strategically chosen sites that appeared to avoid confrontation wherever possible without the loss of life. The defining characteristic of the Nizari Ismaili state was that it was scattered geographically throughout Persia and Syria. The Alamut castle therefore was only one of a nexus of strongholds throughout the regions where Ismailis could retreat to safety if necessary. West of Alamut in the Shahrud Valley, the major fortress of Lamasar served as just one example of such a retreat. In the context of their political uprising, the various spaces of Ismaili military presence took on the name dar al-hijra (place of refuge). The notion of the dar al-hijra refers to the hijrah of the Prophet Muhammad, who migrated to Yathrib with his supporters to avoid the hostility of the Quraysh.

In pursuit of their religious and political goals, the Ismailis adopted various military strategies popular in the Middle Ages. One such method was that of assassination, the selective elimination of prominent rival figures. The murders of political adversaries were usually carried out in public spaces, creating resounding intimidation for other possible enemies. Throughout history, many groups have resorted to assassination as a means of achieving political ends. In the Ismaili context, these assignments were performed by fidā’īs (devotees) of the Ismaili mission. They were unique in that civilians were never targeted. The assassinations were against those whose elimination would most greatly reduce aggression against the Ismailis and, in particular, against those who had perpetrated massacres against the community. A single assassination was usually employed in favour of widespread bloodshed resultant from factional combat. The first instance of assassination in the effort to establish an Nizari Ismaili state in Persia is widely considered to be the murder of Seljuq vizier, Nizam al-Mulk. Carried out by a man dressed as a Sufi whose identity remains unclear, the vizier's murder in a Seljuq court is distinctive of exactly the type of visibility for which missions of the fida’is have been significantly exaggerated. While the Seljuqs and Crusaders both employed assassination as a military means of disposing of factional enemies, during the Alamut period almost any murder of political significance in the Islamic lands was attributed to the Ismailis, whence they came to be known as the "Assassins".

Hassan-i Sabbah founded an observatory and mint within the castle. The treasury was hidden beneath a pool on the western slope, which is reportedly still untouched. A vine tree planted on top on the western slope is also attributed to Hassan-i Sabbah. The Mausolum of Hassan-i Sabbah, which was his burial site together with those of Kia Buzurg-Ummid and Dihdar Ali Ardestani was inside the castle and as demolished just before the Mongol takeover.

== Legend and folklore ==
During the medieval period, Western scholarship on the Ismailis contributed to the popular view of the community as a radical sect of assassins, believed to be trained for the precise murder of their adversaries. By the 14th century, European scholarship on the topic had not advanced much beyond the work and tales from the Crusaders. The origins of the word forgotten, across Europe the term assassin had taken the meaning of "professional murderer". In 1603, the first Western publication on the topic of the Assassins was authored by a court official for King Henry IV and was mainly based on the narratives of Marco Polo (1254–1324) from his visits to the region. While he assembled the accounts of many Western travelers, the author failed to explain the etymology of the term Assassin.

The infamous Assassins were finally linked by orientalists scholar Silvestre de Sacy (d.1838) to the Arabic hashish using their variant names assassini and assissini in the 19th century. Citing the example of one of the first written applications of the Arabic term hashishi to the Ismailis by historian Abu Shams (d.1267), de Sacy demonstrated its connection to the name given to the Ismailis throughout Western scholarship. Ironically, the first known usage of the term hashishi has been traced back to 1122, when the Fatimid Caliph al-Amir employed it in derogatory reference to the Syrian Nizaris. Without accusing the group of utilizing the hashish drug, the caliph used the term in a pejorative manner. This label was quickly applied by anti-Ismaili historians to the Ismailis of Syria and Persia. Used figuratively, the term hashishi connoted meanings such as outcasts or rabble.

The legends of the Assassins had much to do with the training and instruction of Nizari fida’is, famed for their public missions during which they often gave their lives to eliminate adversaries. From the Crusader accounts and the works of historians have contributed to the tales of fida’is being fed with hashish as part of their training. Whether fida’is were actually trained or dispatched by Nizari leaders is unconfirmed, but scholars including Wladimir Ivanow purport that the assassination of key figures including Seljuq vizier Nizam al-Mulk likely provided encouraging impetus to others in the community who sought to secure the Nizaris from political aggression. In fact, the Seljuqs and Crusaders both employed assassination as a military means of disposing of factional enemies. Yet during the Alamut period almost any murder of political significance in the Islamic lands became attributed to the Ismailis. So inflated had this association grown, that in the work of Orientalist scholars such as Bernard Lewis the Ismailis were virtually equated to the politically active fida’is. Thus the Nizari Ismaili community was regarded as a radical and heretical sect known as the Assassins. Originally, a "local and popular term" first applied to the Ismailis of Syria, the label was orally transmitted to Western historians and thus found itself in their histories of the Nizaris.

The tales of the fida’is’ training collected from anti-Ismaili historians and orientalists writers were confounded and compiled in Marco Polo’s account, in which he described a "secret garden of paradise". After being drugged, the Ismaili devotees were said be taken to a paradise-like garden filled with attractive young maidens and beautiful plants in which these fida’is would awaken. Here, they were told by an "old" man that they were witnessing their place in Paradise and that should they wish to return to this garden permanently, they must serve the Nizari cause. So went the tale of the "Old Man in the Mountain", assembled by Marco Polo and accepted by Joseph von Hammer-Purgstall (1774–1856), a prominent orientalist writer responsible for much of the spread of this legend. Until the 1930s, Hammer-Purgstall's retelling of the Assassin legends served across Europe as the standard account of the Nizaris.

Modern works on the Nizaris have elucidated the history of the Nizaris and in doing so, showed that much of the earlier popular history was inaccurate. In 1933, under the direction of the Imam Sultan Muhammad Shah, Aga Khan III (1877–1957), the Islamic Research Association was developed. Prominent historian Wladimir Ivanow, was central to both this institution and the 1946 Ismaili Society of Bombay. Cataloguing a number of Ismaili texts, Ivanow provided the ground for great strides in modern Ismaili scholarship.

In 2005, the archaeologist Peter Willey published evidence suggesting that the Assassin histories of earlier scholars were simply repeating inaccurate folklore. Drawing on its established esoteric doctrine, Willey asserts that the Ismaili understanding of Paradise is a deeply symbolic one. While the Qur'anic description of Heaven includes natural imagery, Willey argues that no Nizari fida’i would seriously believe that he was witnessing Paradise simply by awakening in a beauteous garden. The Nizaris' symbolic interpretation of the Qur'anic description of Paradise serves as evidence against the possibility of such an exotic garden having been used as motivation for the devotees to carry out suicidal missions. Furthermore, Willey points out that Juvayni, the courtier of the Great Khan Mongke, surveyed the Alamut castle just before the Mongol invasion. In Juvayni's reports about of the fortress, there are elaborate descriptions of sophisticated storage facilities and of the famous Alamut library. However, even this anti-Ismaili observer makes no mention of the folkloric gardens on the Alamut grounds. Having destroyed a number of texts of the library's collection, deemed by Juvayni to be heretical, it would be expected that he would have paid significant attention to the Nizari gardens, particularly if they were the site of drug use and temptation. Given that Juvayni makes no mention of all about such gardens, Willey concludes that there is no sound evidence that the gardens are anything more than legends. A reference collection of material excavated at Alamut Castle by Willey is in the British Museum.

== In popular culture ==
- In 1918, Harold Lamb published a short story, "Alamut" in Adventure, featuring Lamb's recurring character, Khlit the Cossack.
- In 1938, Slovenian novelist Vladimir Bartol published the novel Alamut. Alamut is a canonical work of Slovene literature, and has been translated into most major literary languages.
- In his 1984 story The Walking Drum, Louis L'Amour uses Alamut as the setting for the rescue of Kerbouchard's father.
- Alamut and Hassan-i-Sabbah are described vividly in William S. Burroughs' 1987 book, The Western Lands.
- Alamut is described in detail towards the end of Umberto Eco's 1987 novel Foucault's Pendulum.
- Hassan-i Sabbah and his rule over Alamut play a role in the 1988 historical novel Samarkand by Lebanese-French writer, Amin Maalouf.
- The Alamut series of fantasy-historical novels was published by American author Judith Tarr between 1989 and 1991.
- A fictional depiction of Alamut castle in the middle of the 13th century and its fall in 1256 is featured in the 1996 The Children of the Grail books series by German author Peter Berling.
- In the role-playing game, Vampire: the Masquerade, by White Wolf, Inc., the clan Assamite uses Alamut as its central headquarters.
- A fictional depiction of the fall of the Alamut citadel is described in the 2008 novel Bones of the Hills, from the Conqueror series written by Conn Iggulden.
- Assad, the protagonist in Scott Oden's 2010 novel, The Lion of Cairo, is an assassin from Alamut.
- Alamut is the city of Princess Tamina (Gemma Arterton) and the location of the Sands of Time in the 2010 film Prince of Persia: The Sands of Time.
- Alamut is featured in the video game franchise Assassin's Creed, which draws heavy inspiration from the history of the Assassin Order. It first appears in the novel Assassin's Creed: The Secret Crusade, wherein the protagonist Altaïr Ibn-LaʼAhad seeks refuge in the fortress during his exile from Masyaf and discovers it was unknowingly built atop an ancient temple of the First Civilization, from which he retrieves several Memory Seals. Alamut and its First Civilization Temple are later mentioned in the game Assassin's Creed Rogue, where it is revealed that the character Edward Kenway came across them during his search for First Civilization sites across the globe. Alamut also appears as a major location in the game Assassin's Creed Mirage, which takes place around the time construction of the fortress finished in 865; it is depicted as the main headquarters of the Assassins, despite them not historically occupying Alamut until two centuries later.

== See also ==
- Atashgah Castle
- Alamut (region)
- Hassan-i Sabbah
- Lambsar Castle
- List of Ismaili castles
- Iranian architecture
- Qiyama (Nizari Isma'ilism)

== Family tree ==
‘Ubayd’Allâh'ibn‘al’Huseyn‘al’Madhî
Fatimids (Seven pillars)
Muhammad al-Qaim Bi-Amrillah
Isma'il al-Mansur Bi-Nasrillah
Al-Mu'izz li-Din Allah
Abu Mansoor Nizar al-Aziz Billah
Al-Hakim bi-Amr Allah
Ali az-Zahir
Ma'ad al-Mustansir
Nizārī Ismā'īlīs	Mustā‘līs
Abû Mansûr Nizâr al-Mustafâ li-Dîn’il-Lâh	Abû’l-Qâsim ʿAhmed al-Mustâ‘lî
Ali al-Hâdî ibn al-Nizâr	Abû‘Ali’Mansûr‘al’Âmir’bi'Ahkâm’îl‘Lâh
Alamut (Shī‘a Imāmī Ismā'īlī Ṭarīqah)	Hafizi	At-Tayyib Abu'l-Qasim
Al-Mohtadî ibn al-Hâdî (Muhammad I)	'Abd al-Majīd al-Ḥāfiẓ
Hasan'I’al‘Kahir’bi‘Quwwat’ûl‘Lâh/Ahkâm’îl‘Lâh	al-Ẓāfir
Hasan II (Alâ Zikrihi’s-Selâm)	al-Fā'iz
Nûr’ad-Dīn Muḥammad II (‘Ala Muhammad)	al-'Āḍid
Jalâl’ud-Dîn Hasan III
‘Alā’ad-Dīn Muḥammad III
Ruknu-d-Dīn Khurshāh
Aga Khan IV (Nezār’îyyāh)	Tāyyibī Da'is (Dawoodi Bohras)

== Sources ==
- Daftary, Farhad (2007). The Ismāʿı̄lı̄s: Their History and Doctrines (Second ed.). Cambridge: Cambridge University Press. ISBN 978-0-521-61636-2.
