= Lambsar Castle =

UNESCO World Heritage Site in Iran

Lambsar
- لمبسر
- Lambsar Castle

- Location within Iran

General information
- Type: Castle
- Location: Alamut, Razmian, Iran
- Coordinates: 36.5476°N 50.2273°E

UNESCO World Heritage Site
- Official name: Lambesar Castle
- Part of: Alamūt Castle and Related Fortifications
- Criteria: Cultural: iii
- Reference: 1770
- Inscription: 2026 (48th Session)

Lambsar (Persian: لمبسر, also pronounced Lamsar), Lamasar, Lambasar, Lambesar (لمبه سر) or Lomasar (لمسر) was probably the largest and the most fortified of the Ismaili castles. The fortress is located in the central Alborz mountains, south of the Caspian Sea, about 120 km from present-day Tehran, Iran. Lambsar is to the northeast of Razmian village (the central district of Rudbar e Shahrestan).

Kiya Buzurg Ummid (died 1138) captured the castle from Rasamuj and rebuilt it into a major stronghold using local labour. He was appointed by Hassan-i Sabbah (died 1124) as its governor.

Only ruins remain of the fortress today. Deep valleys surrounding the fortress make it inaccessible from the East and West sides. The North and South fronts are the only possible ways to get into the fortress. Although the slope of the mountain with a difference of 150m on both levels is stretched from north to south with a length of 480m, the castle is more than 190m in width. The huge two-layered parapets made up of very large 10m high stones, along with the main building in the north of the fortress with 1.2m wide cut stone walls, wonderful water reservoirs and grain stores in the south and southeast of the castle, towers and a water supply system are among the characteristics and features left within the Lambsar fortress which intrigue visitors. In the North side of the fortress a huge building with 4 smaller extensions remain which face to the East.

In July 2026, the Alamūt Castle and Related Fortifications (including the Lambsar Castle) were designated by UNESCO as a World Heritage Site.

== Final days ==
The Isma'ilis’ forts were the last line of defense against Mongol aggression in Iran. The Mongols had a hard time conquering the Isma'ili forts. Hulaku Khan was disappointed with his commanders therefore he took over an army of 10,000 soldiers and moved toward Alamut. In 1256 after a couple months the Meymoon-Dej (Meymoon-Diž, Persian: میمون دژ) fort surrendered to Hulaku’s army, and Imam Rukn al-Din Khurshah was captured. Hulaku Khan asked Khurshah to order his followers to surrender, but Lambsar fort, Gerdkuh fort and Alamut fort did not follow the order. Finally, after a year of resistance, a cholera epidemic took many lives in Lambsar and the fort fell in January 1257. Hulaku ordered the fort ruined and beheaded whoever had survived the deadly disease. In 1275 and again in 1389, small groups of Isma'ilis who had survived the Mongol invasions attempted to recapture Alamut, but their attempts were short-lived.

== Gallery ==
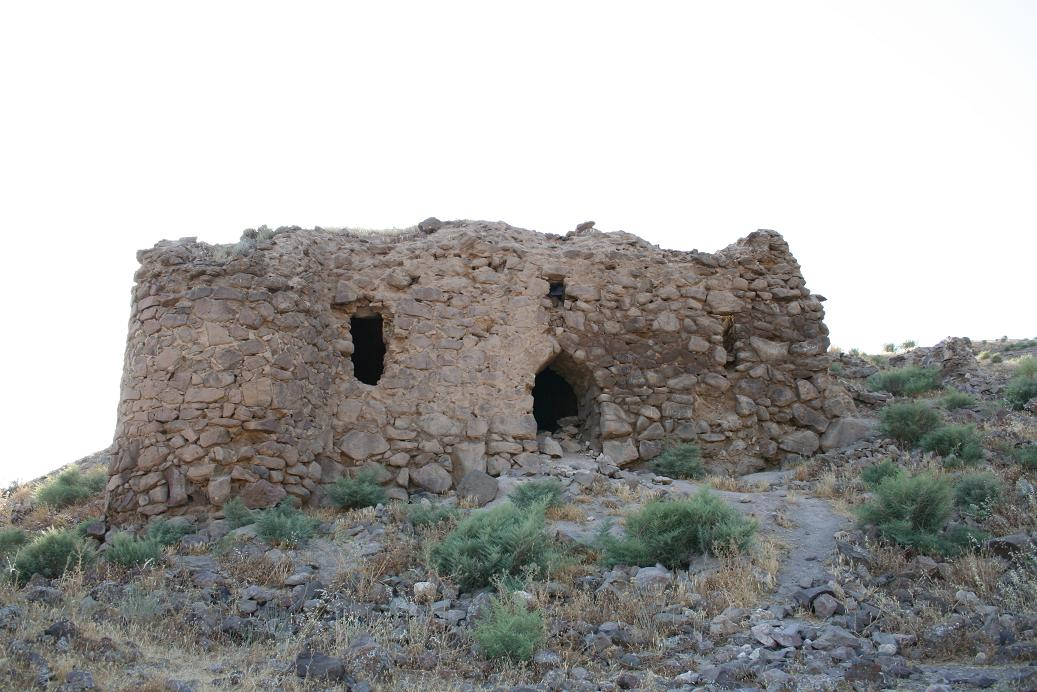
The castle measures 180m in width, with walls measuring 1.2 m in thickness at places.

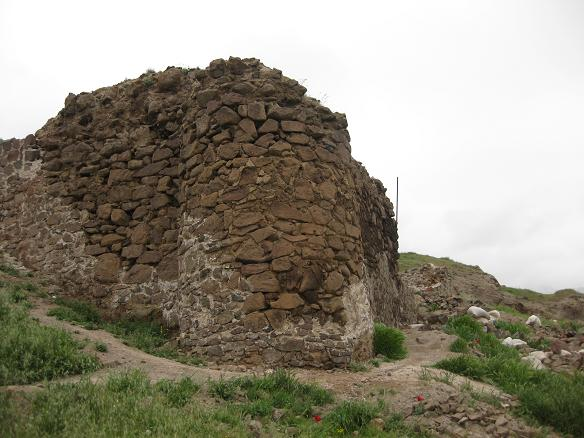
Remains of Lambsar Castle

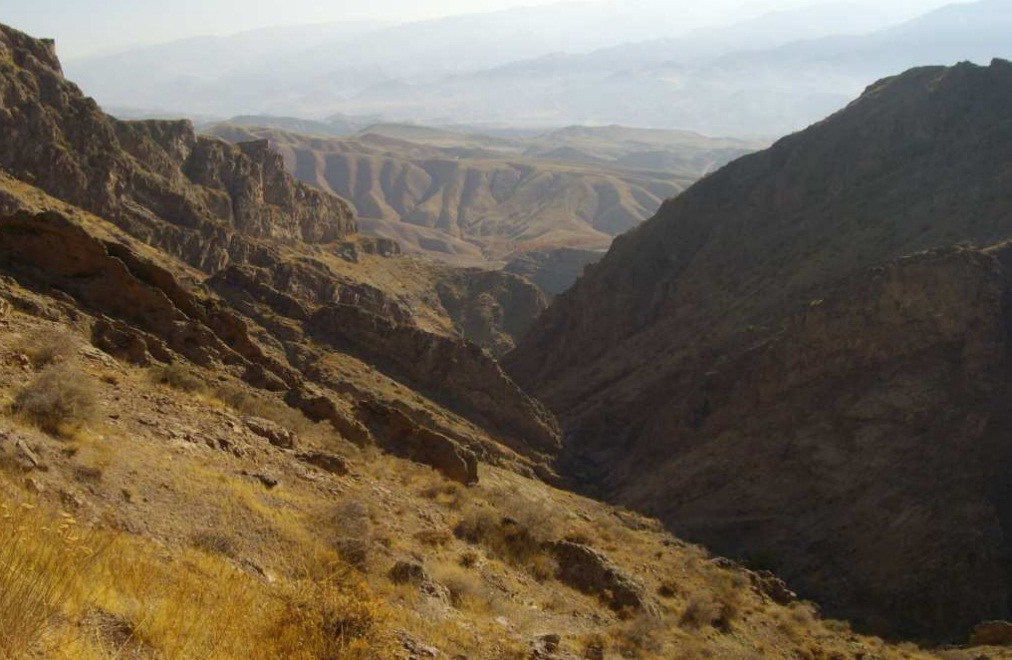
Around Lambsar Castle

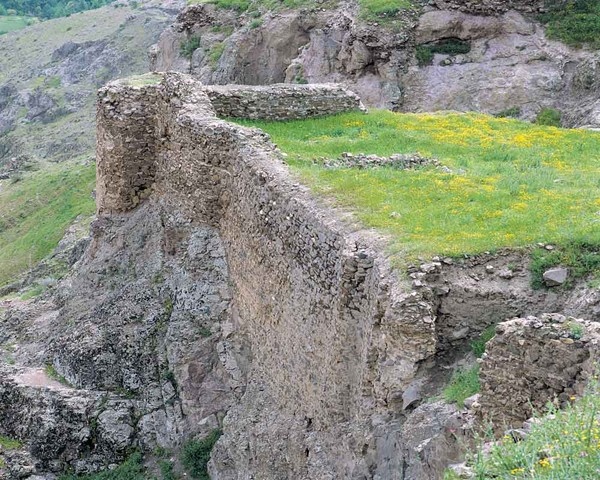
Lambsar Castle, top view

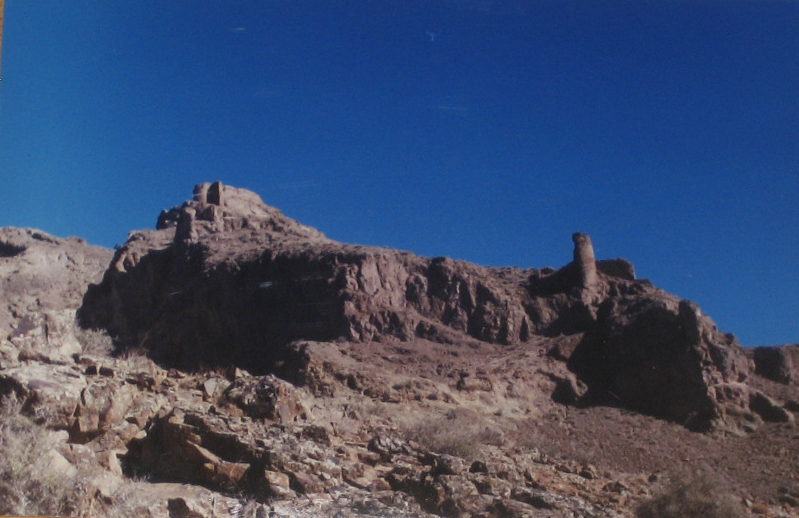

== See also ==
- Muhammad Tapar's anti-Nizari campaign
- Ismaili
- Iranian architecture
- Alamut Castle
- Atashgah Castle
- Masyaf Castle
