= Rukn al-Din Khurshah =

27th Nizari Isma'ili Imam

Rukn al-Dīn al-Hasan ibn Muhammad Khurshāh
- ركن الدین الحسن بن محمد خورشاه
- Born: 627 AH/1230 AD
- Died: 654 AH/1256 AD
- Term: 1255–1256 AD
- Predecessor: Ala al-Din Muhammad III
- Successor: Shams al-Din Muhammad

Rukn al-Dīn al-Hasan ibn Muhammad Khurshāh (or Khwarshāh) (ركن الدین الحسن بن محمد خورشاه) (1230–1256) was the son of 'Alā' ad-Dīn Muḥammad III and the 27th Isma'ili Imam. He was also the fifth and final Nizari Isma'ili Imam who ruled at Alamut. The Imam was the eldest son of Imam ʿAla al-Din Muhammad and succeeded his murdered father to the Imamate in 1255. Imam Rukn al-Din engaged in a long series of negotiations with the invading Mongols, and under whose leadership Alamut Castle was surrendered to the Mongol Empire marking the end of the Nizari state in Persia.

== Surrender of Ismaili citadels to the Mongols ==
Ruknuddin Hasan (Rukn al-Dīn), surnamed Khurshāh or Khwarshāh was born in 627 AH/1230 CE. He is also known as Kahirshah. When he was still a child, his father had declared him as his successor. Persian historian Ata-Malik Juvayni denigrates the Nizari line of Imamate, claiming that they are not true Alids but instead descended from a da'i, but acknowledges their descent from Nizar: "And today, the leader of the heretics of Alamut traces his descent from this son." (p. 663)

His father, Imam 'Alā' ad-Dīn Muḥammad had taken due care of rudiments of his formal education at home under personal care. When he grew, his father designated him his deputy to investigate few cases of disorders in some castles, with an instruction to obey his orders as his own. In 653/1255, before his father's death, he is reported to have visited Syria with a letter of his father. Strict protection had been given to Rukn, and wherever he went, a small unit of armed men accompanied him as security guards. It is related that he stayed more than a year in the castles of Rudbar and Kohistan for making fresh administrative fabric, and thus the enemies of the Ismailis smacked of exaggerations that his relation had been deteriorated with his father.

Three days later, having assumed the Imamate, Rukn sent an army which his father had ordered against Shal-Rud in the district of Khalkhal. The Ismaili forces occupied the castle after a small fighting.

In 1256, Rukn al-Din commenced a series of gestures demonstrating his submission to the invading Mongols. In a show of his compliance and at the demand of Hulegu Khan, Rukn al-Din began the dismantling process at Alamut Castle, Maymundiz and Lambsar Castle, removing towers and battlements. However, as winter approached, Hulegu took these gestures to be a means of delaying his seizure of the castles and on 8 November 1256 the Mongol troops quickly encircled the Maymundiz fortress and residence of the Imam. After four days of preliminary bombardment with significant casualties for both sides, the Mongols assembled their mangonels around the castle in preparation for a direct siege. There was still no snow on the ground and the attacks proceeded, forcing Rukn al-Din to declare his surrender in exchange for his and his family's safe passage. After another bombardment, Rukn al-Din descended from Maymundiz on 19 November.

In the hands of Hulegu, Rukn al-Din was forced to send the message of surrender to all the castles in the Alamut valley. At the Alamut fortress, the Mongol prince Balaghai led his troops to the base of the castle, calling for the surrender of the commander of Alamut, Muqaddam al-Din. It was decreed that should he surrender and pledge his allegiance to the Khagan within one day, the lives of those at Alamut would be spared. Muqaddam al-Din was reluctant and wondered if the Imam's message of surrender was actually an act of duress. In obedience to the Imam, Muqaddam and his men descended from the fortress, and the Mongol army entered Alamut and began its demolition. Many of the other fortresses had already complied, therefore not only would Muqaddam's resistance have resulted in a direct battle for the castle, but the explicit violation of the instructions of the Imam, which would impact significantly on the Ismaili commander's oath of total obedience to the Imam.

The recorded attitude of Hulegu toward the surrendered Imam appears ambiguous; at times he treated the Khurshah with great deference and viewed him with "attention and kindness", even presenting him munificent gifts. Nevertheless, the Imam ultimately asked Hulegu to let him visit the Mongol Khagan in person, embarking on a long journey to Karakorum, Mongolia. When Rukn al-Din met Möngke Khan there, the latter rebuked him and demanded the surrender of the remaining castles, such as Gerdkuh and Lambsar. En route back to his homeland, Rukn al-Din was put to death in 1256 near Toungat (تنغات; reading uncertain, possibly referring to the Tannu-Ola mountains).

He was succeeded by his son Shams al-Dīn Muḥammad.

Regnal titles
Preceded by Ala al-Din Muhammad III	8th ruler of the Nizari Ismaili state and commander of Alamut Castle; 1255–1256	Mongol conquest
Shia Islam titles
Preceded by Ala al-Din Muhammad III	27th Imam of Nizari Isma'ilism; 1255–1257	Succeeded by Shams al-Din Muhammad
