= Tarikh-i Jahangushay =

Chronicle of the Mongol conquest of Persia

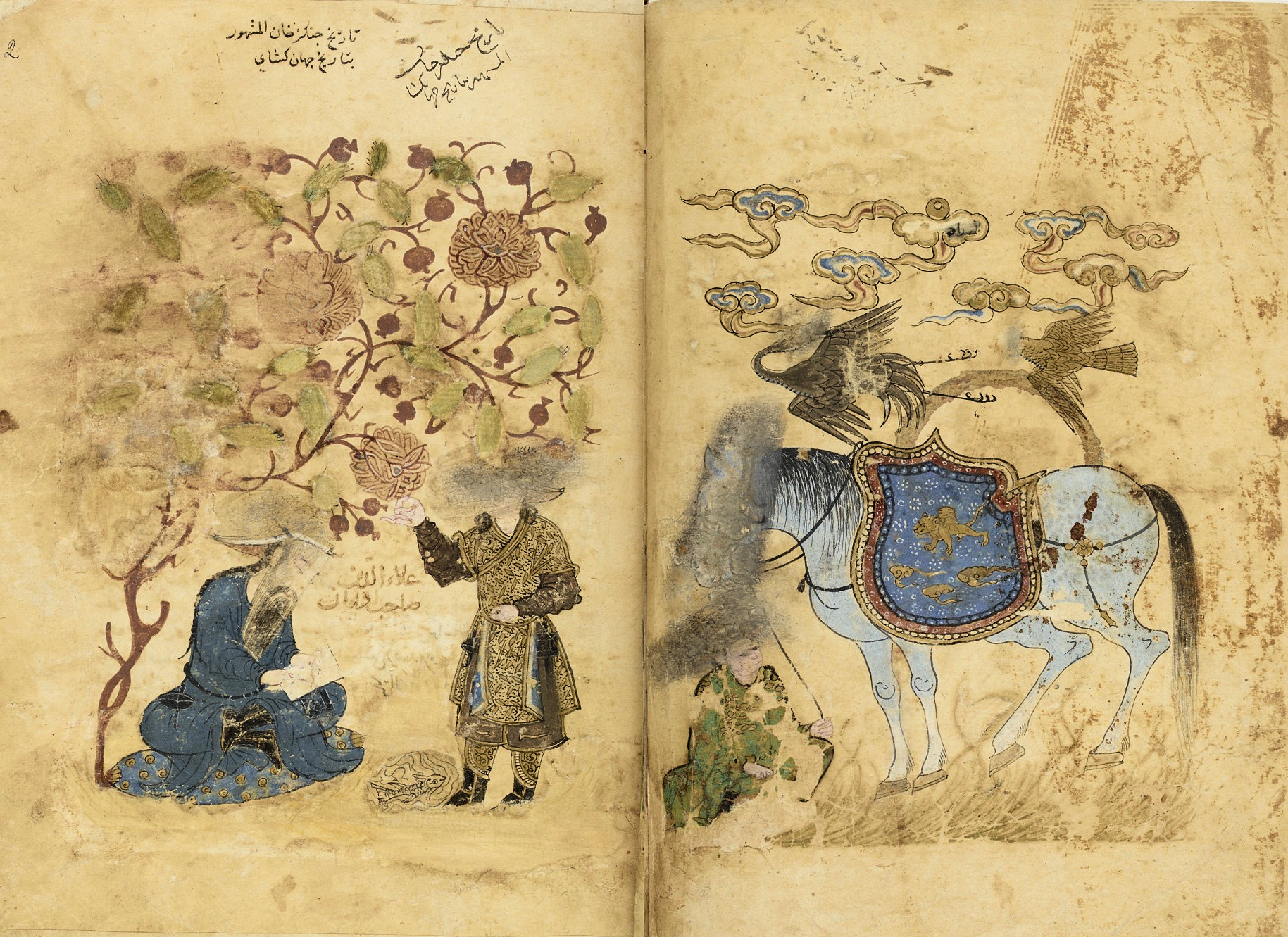
Frontispiece of Tarikh-i Jahangushay, depicting Ata-Malik Juvayni sitting and writing in front of Arghun Aqa, dated 1290. Located in the Bibliothèque Nationale de France (Suppl. Pers. 205). This is one of the first Persian miniatures. The sky design with volutes is known as "Chinese cloud".

Tārīkh-i Jahāngushāy (Persian: تاریخ جهانگشای, lit. 'The History of the World Conqueror') or Tārīkh-i Jahāngushāy-i Juwaynī (تاریخ جهانگشای جوینی) is a detailed historical account written by bureaucrat and historian, Ata-Malik Juvayni, describing the Mongol, Hulegu Khan, and Ilkhanid conquest of Persia as well as the history of Isma'ilis. It is considered an invaluable work of Persian literature.

Written in Persian, it is one of the earliest known examples of Persian miniature and the "Metropolitan style" of the Mongol Ilkhanid court, together with the 1297-1299 manuscript Manafi' al-Hayawan (Ms M. 500) commissioned by Mongol ruler Ghazan. There are no earlier known Persian illustrated manuscripts from before the Mongol conquest (with the possible exception of Varka and Golshah, which however was created in Konya, at the time of the Sultanate of Rum sometime in the 13th century), although miniatures are known from Mina'i ceramics.

== Sources ==
Speaking of his sources, Juvayni mentioned of him "studying" in Mongolia during his trips there, "observing" some aspects first-hand. Parts of the history include events he witnessed first-hand, during his service as an official under Hulegu. Regarding the past events, he used narrations from "reliable" people. These include Iranian aristocrats and scribes (such as his father), but apparently also some Mongols, Turks, and Uyghurs. However, apparently he did not have access to the documents and scrolls stored in the Mongol court (which Rashid al-Din Hamadani called "Altan Debter"), as evident from his lack of knowledge about the Mongols before Chengiz.

Books used by Juvayni as primary source include Masharib al-Tajarib of Abu al-Hassan Bayhaqi and Jawami' al-'Ulum by Fakhr al-Din Razi, as well as the lost Ismaili works Sarguzasht-i Sayyidina and Tarikh-i Jil wa Daylam which he took from the Alamut Library before it was destroyed.

== Contents ==
This account of the Mongol invasions of his homeland Iran, written based on survivor accounts, is one of the main sources on the rapid sweep of Genghis Khan's armies through the nomadic tribes of Central Asia and the established cities of the Silk Road including Otrar, Bukhara, and Samarkand in 1219, and successive campaigns until Genghis Khan's death in 1227 and beyond.

Juvayni's writing is sometimes inflated, as when he estimates the strength of the Mongol army at 700,000, against other accounts that put the number between 105,000 and 130,000. His descriptions are often written from a sense of drama.*

Juvayni's descriptions are, however, a very valuable resource for contemporary Mongol history, along with the work of Rashid al-Din, and the Secret History of the Mongols.

=== Description of Mongol hunts ===
One of his convincing descriptions is that of the Mongol hunt or nerge as an army training exercise for the nomadic Mongols. In a nerge, the whole army rounded up all the animals over a large region, in order to obtain dried meat before the onset of winter.

In the time of Genghis Khan, the nerge was converted into an exercise in discipline, with severe punishments for commanders of tens, hundreds, or thousands who let animals escape. This is because the Yassa, the Mongolian de facto law, is without respect of persons and, according to the Persian historian Mirkhvand, enjoins corporal punishment without respect of persons for those who allow animals to escape. Once rounded up, the animals were ruthlessly massacred, first by the Khan, then by princes, and finally, only after so commanded, by all the army. This was to form a model for the ruthlessness of Mongol attacks on well-established human settlements.

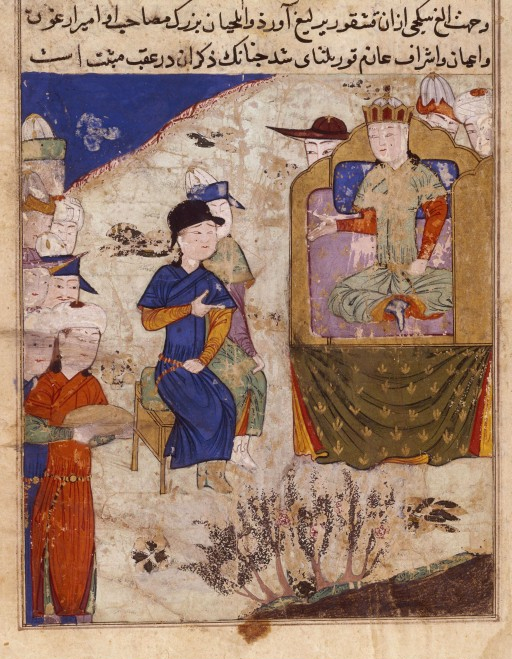
Audience de Möngke. Manuscript copied in 1438 (Supp. Persan 206)

An account of the tragic failure of a Chinese student – (Jiang Rong: "The Wolf") – to save a wild wolf of a type formerly hunted by the historical Mongol people (and still today by their descendants), would indicate that wolves were targeted by such hunts, as traditional methods of the ravaging wolves in imminent danger of extinction were described. Snow leopards and others were also likely to have been hunted.

== Critical edition and translation ==
Juvayni stopped working on the original Persian-language text in 1260, leaving it in a disorganised and incomplete state. In the twentieth century, Mirza Muhammad Qazvini compiled a critical edition, which was published in 1937.

Based on Qavzini's text, John Andrew Boyle produced an English translation in two volumes in 1958. A book review of the 1958 edition was published by The American Historical Review. A revised edition of the Boyle translation was published in 1997.
