= Shirkuh Castle =

UNESCO World Heritage Site in Iran

- قلعه شیرکوه

General information
- Type: Castle
- Location: Qazvin County, Iran

UNESCO World Heritage Site
- Official name: Širkūh Fortification
- Part of: Alamūt Castle and Related Fortifications
- Criteria: Cultural: iii
- Reference: 1770
- Inscription: 2026 (48th Session)

Shirkuh Castle (Persian: قلعه شیرکوه) is a historic castle located in Qazvin County in Qazvin province, Iran. It is situated 1851 metres above sea level near the confluence of Alamut and Taleqan rivers. This fortress dates back to the Sasanian Empire and was later used by the Nizari Ismaili state. In July 2026, the Alamūt Castle and Related Fortifications (including the Shirkuh Castle) were designated by UNESCO as a World Heritage Site.
