= Alamut =

Region in Iran

Coordinates: 36°26′41″N 50°35′11″E

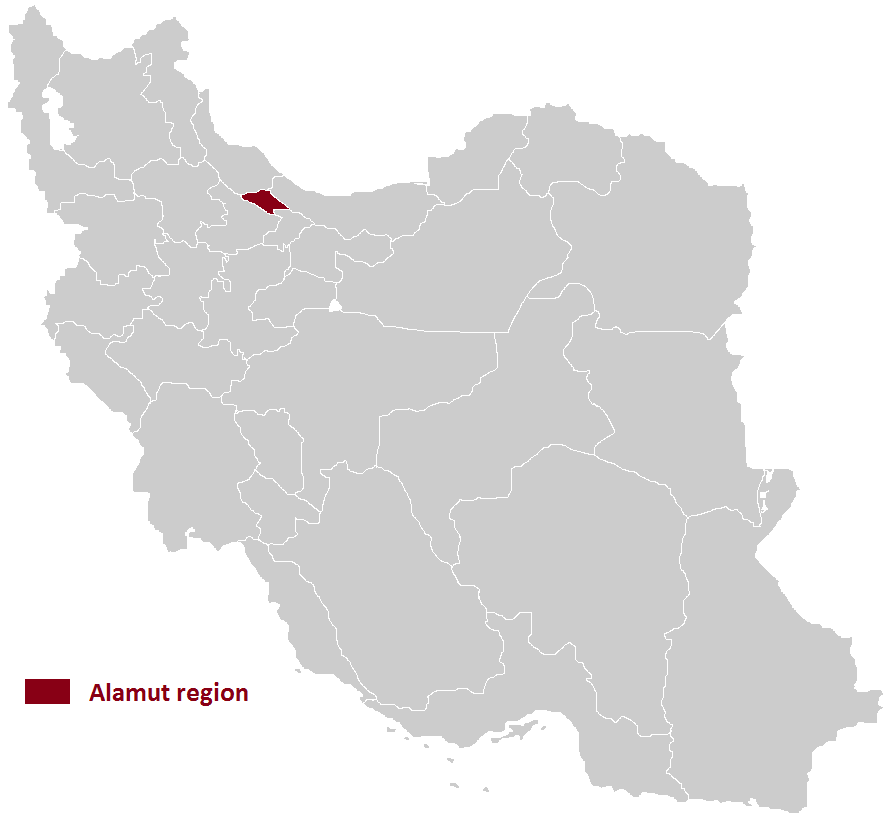
Alamut geographic region in Iran

Alamut (Persian: الموت), historically also called Rudbar (Persian: رودبار), is a region in Iran including western and eastern parts on the western edge of the Alborz (Elburz) range, between the dry and barren plain of Qazvin in the south and the densely forested slopes of the Mazandaran province in the north. Starting from Qazvin toward Alamut, passing through the first range of hills, curvatures, forms, are significant themes in nature's composition of this area. The famous Ismaili castle of Alamut and numerous others are in this area, which served as the heartland of the state founded by Hassan-i Sabbah.

According to some sources, the majority of people in northern Qazvin (Alamut) are Tats who speak a dialect of the Tati language. However, other sources claim that the majority of people in Alamut are Mazanderani or Gilaks who speak a dialect of the Mazanderani language or Gilaki language. According to some linguists, the term ‘Tati’ was used by Turkic speakers to refer to non-turkic speakers. This could explain why some sources claim the people of Alamut are Tats, while others claim they are Mazanderanies or Gilaks. Likely, the ‘Tats’ of Alamut are Mazanderani or Gilak speakers who have been labeled as Tats as historically they were considered Mazanderani or Gilaks.

== Name ==
Alamut (Persian: الموت), historically also known as Rudbar (رودبار), was named after the Shahrud river.

More precisely, Alamut is a small region in the historical Rudbar in which the namesake castle is located. The region is also called Rudbar of Alamut (رودبار الموت Rūdbār-i Alamūt).

== History ==
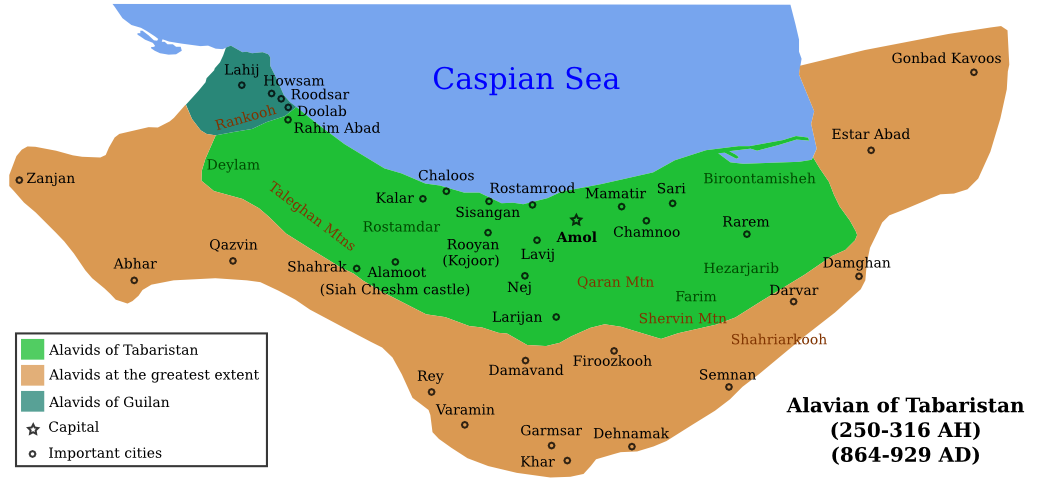
Alamut in the time of Alavis

In 1090 CE, Hassan-i Sabbah, the Arab founder and leader of the Assassins, a sect of Nizari Ismailis in Iran, chose the Alamut region as his headquarters to campaign, preach and convert new followers. This proved to be a turning point for the destiny of Alamut Valley. The result of over two centuries of Ismailite stronghold, the region witnessed numerous castles throughout, of which at least 20 "castles" dating back to this era have been identified. The most magnificent castle in the Alamut Valley is the Alamut Castle, which is built on top of a high rock reaching 2163 m above sea level near the Gazor Khan Village. The rock is 200 m high and covers an area of 20 hectares (49 acres); with its steep slope and deep and dangerous ravine, the rock is practically inaccessible and forms a part of the fort’s structure. Currently, only ruins of the fort and some towers are apparent, and it is only through archaeological excavation that the main portions can be discovered.

=== Lords of Alamut Castle who ruled the Nizārī Ismā'īlī state from Alamūt ===
The President of Nizārī Ismā'īlī state	Period	Master of Alamūt
The First Da'i Hasan bin Sabbah	1090-1124	1. Effendi/Lord
The Second Da'i Kiya Buzurg-Ummid	1124-1138	2. Effendi/Lord
The Third Da'i Muḥammad ibn Kiyā Buzurg-Ummīd	1138-1162	3. Effendi/Lord
23rd Imām Hasan ‘Alā Dhīkr‘īhī’s-Salām	1162-1166	4. Effendi/Lord
24th Imām Nūr al-Dīn Muhammad	1166-1210	5. Effendi/Lord
25th Imām Jalāl al-Dīn Hasan	1210-1221	6. Effendi/Lord
26th Imām ‘Alā’a-d-Dīn Muḥammad III	1221-1255	7. Effendi/Lord
27th Imām Rukn al-Din Khurshah	1255-1256	The state ended

Today, the leader of the contemporary Ismaili community is the Aga Khan.

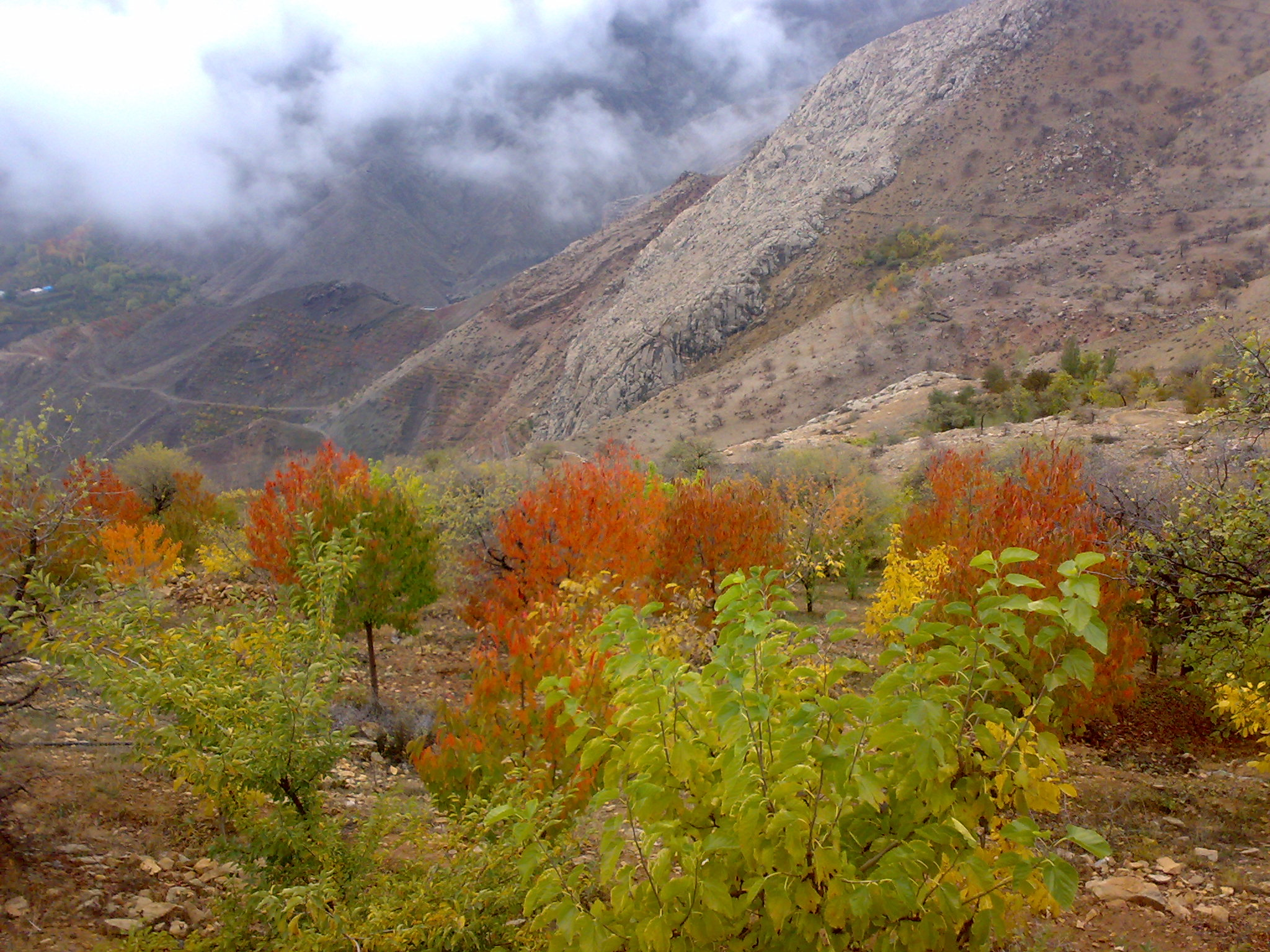
Hir, West Alamut

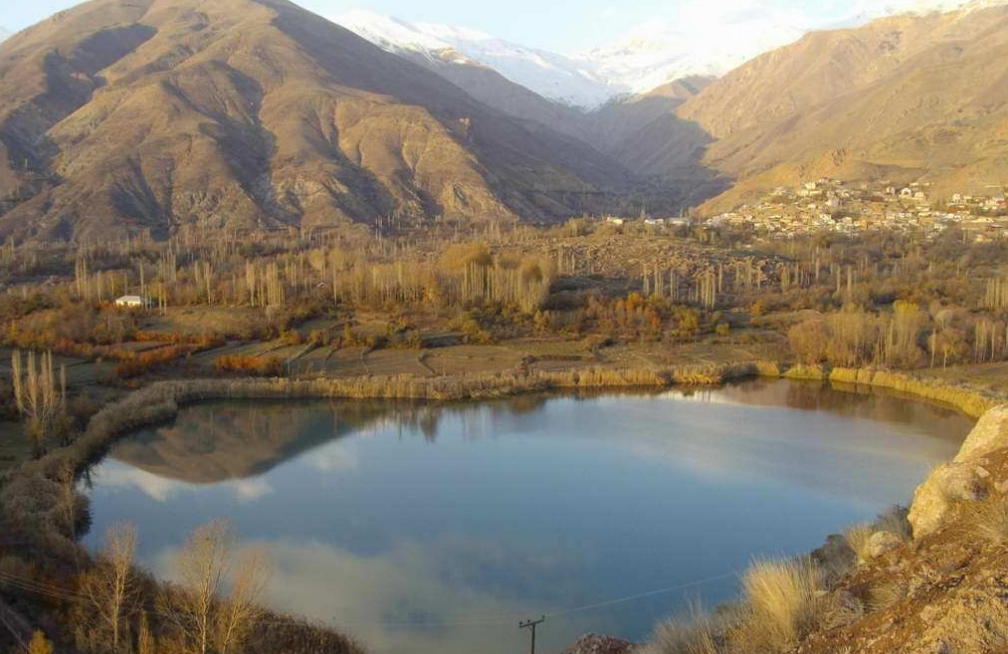
Ovan Lake, East Alamut

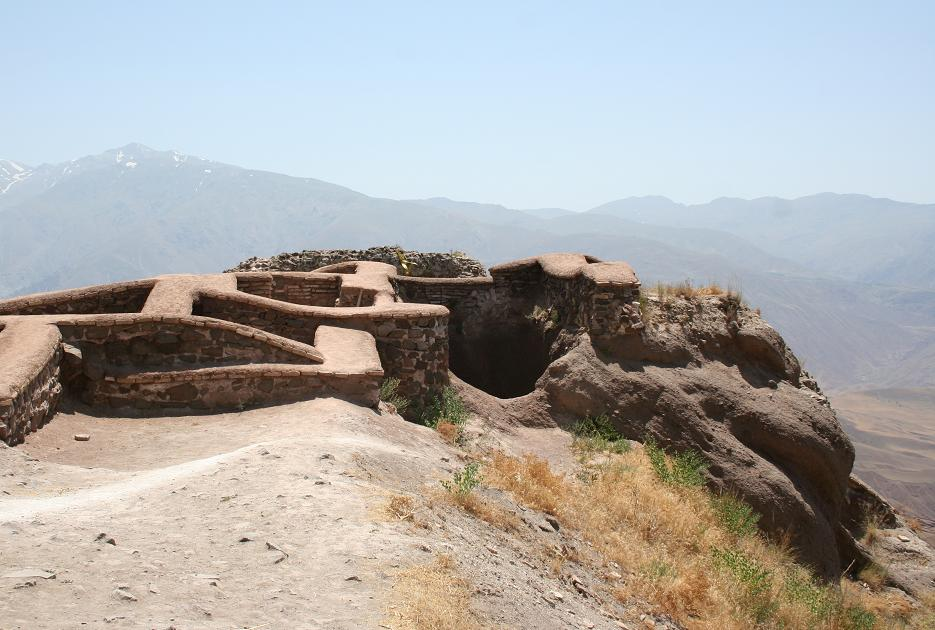
Alamut fortification in Iran and Ismailites Assassins stronghold

== Alamut rulers ==
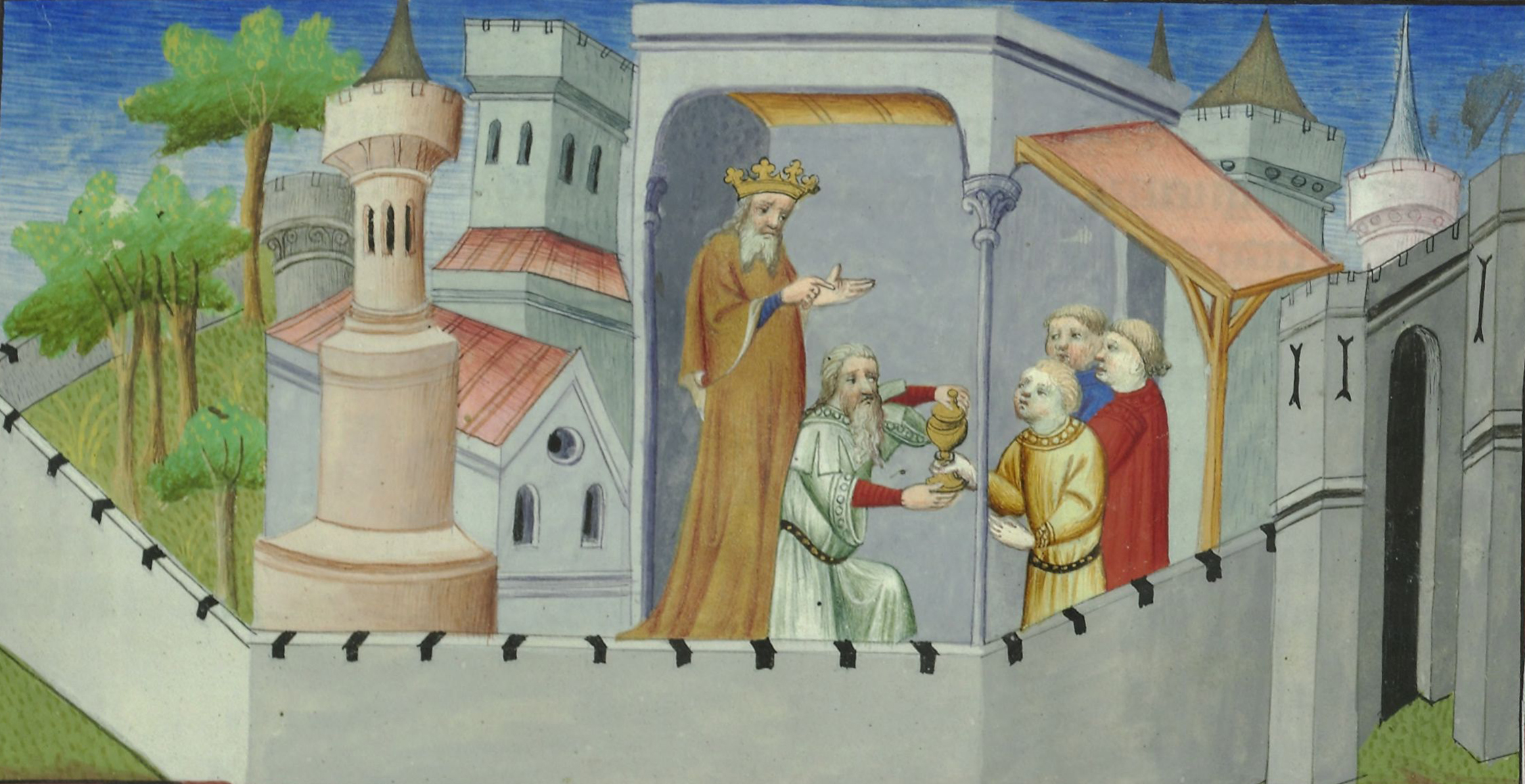
The 26th Nizārī Ismā'īlī Imām ‘Alā’ ad-Dīn Muḥammad III ibn Jalāl al-Dīn Hasan in The Travels of Marco Polo by Marco Polo. (Bibliothèque nationale de France)

- Hassan-i Sabbah
- Kia Bozorg Omid
- Muḥammad ibn Kiyā Buzurg-Ummīd
- Ali al-Hadi ibn Nizar
- Al-Muhtadi (Nizari imam)
- Al-Qahir (Imam)
- Hasan Alâ Zikrihi’s Selâm
- Nūr al-Dīn Muḥammad II
- Jalaluddin Hasan
- ‘Alā’ ad-Dīn Muḥammad III
- Ruknu-d-Dīn Khurshāh (The last ruler of the Alamut Castle)

== See also ==
- Alamut River
- List of Ismaili castles
- Alamut-e Gharbi District
- Alamut-e Sharqi District
- Alamut-e Bala Rural District
- Alamut-e Pain Rural District
- (in Turkish) Kıyâmet-i Kûbrâ
- Alamut, novel written by Vladimir Bartol in 1938
- Alam-Kuh
