= The Lord of Alamut =

The Lord of Alamut (Hassan Sabbah) (Persian: حسن صباح خداوند الموت Khudāvand‑i Almūt: Ḥasan Ṣabbāḥ) is a 1964 Persian-language historical fiction book by Zabihullah Mansouri under the name of Pol Amir, about the order of Hasan-i Sabbah set in Alamut, and Iran. The book covers the assassination of Nizam al-Mulk.

== Film adaptation ==
- Iranian TV series

== Reception ==
The book's historical value has been questioned.

== See also ==
- Nizari Ismaili state
- Nizari–Seljuk conflicts
