= Fakhr al-Mulk (Seljuk vizier) =

Bureaucrat and Vizier of the Seljuq Sultanate

Seljuk Vizier
- In office 1095 – 1099
- Monarch: Berkyaruq
- In office 1101 – 1106
- Monarch: Ahmad Sanjar

Personal details
- Died: 1110s
- Parent: Nizam al-Mulk
- Relatives: Brothers: Shams al-Mulk Uthman; Abulfath Fakhr al-Malik; Mu'ayyid al-Mulk; Jamal al-Mulk; Diya al-Mulk; Izz al-Mulk; Imad al-Mulk Abu'l-Kasim; Safiyya (sister)

Fakhr al-Mulk was a Persian bureaucrat, who served as the vizier of the Seljuk sultan Berkyaruq (r. 1092–1105) from 1095 to 1099, and later vizier of the Sejluk prince and ruler of Khurasan, Ahmad Sanjar, from 1101 to 1106. He was the eldest son of the prominent Seljuk vizier Nizam al-Mulk.

== Sources ==
- Bosworth, C. E. (1968). "The Political and Dynastic History of the Iranian World (A.D. 1000–1217)". In Frye, R. N. (ed.). The Cambridge History of Iran, Volume 5: The Saljuq and Mongol periods. Cambridge: Cambridge University Press. pp. 1–202. ISBN 0-521-06936-X.
- Bosworth, C. E. (1988). "Barkīāroq". Encyclopaedia Iranica, Vol. III, Fasc. 8. pp. 800–801.
- Bosworth, C. E. (1997). "Ebn Dārost, Tāj al-Molk Abu'l-Ḡanā'em Marzbān". Encyclopaedia Iranica, Vol. VIII, Fasc. 1. pp. 12–13.
- Bosworth, C. E. (1999). "Faḵr-al-Molk". Encyclopaedia Iranica, Vol. IX, Fasc. 2. pp. 164–165.
- Cahen, Cl (1960). "Barkyārūḳ". In Gibb, H. A. R.; Kramers, J. H.; Lévi-Provençal, E.; Schacht, J.; Lewis, B. & Pellat, Ch. (eds.). The Encyclopaedia of Islam, Second Edition. Volume I: A–B. Leiden: E. J. Brill. OCLC 495469456.
- Peacock, A. C. S. (2015). The Great Seljuk Empire. Edinburgh University Press. pp. 1–378. ISBN 9780748638260.
- Richards, D.S. (2014). The Annals of the Saljuq Turks: Selections from al-Kamil fi'l-Ta'rikh of Ibn al-Athir. Routledge. ISBN 9781317832546.
- Tetley, Gillies (2008). The Ghaznavid and Seljuk Turks: Poetry as a Source for Iranian History. Routledge. ISBN 9781134084388.
