= Ali ibn Ishak =

11th-century Persian politician

Ali ibn Ishak, also known as Abu'l Hasan, was a Persian dehqan who served as the financial minister of the Ghaznavids. He was a native of small village named Radkan, near Tus, in Iran. When the Seljuq Turks conquered Khorasan in 1040, Ali fled to Ghazni, where his son Nizam al-Mulk was working within the government. Nizam would later serve the Seljuqs, where he became the vizier of the Empire and almost held near absolute power over 20 years. Nothing more is known about the life of Ali.

== Sources ==
- C.E., Bosworth (2012). "Niẓām al-Mulk". Encyclopaedia of Islam (2nd ed.). Leiden and New York: BRILL. ISBN 9789004161214.
