= Three Schoolfellows =

Medieval Persian tale

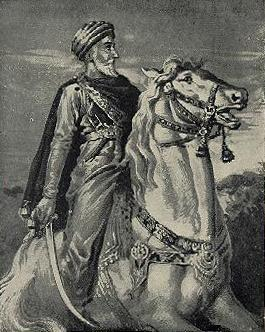
Hasan-i Sabbah, revolutionary

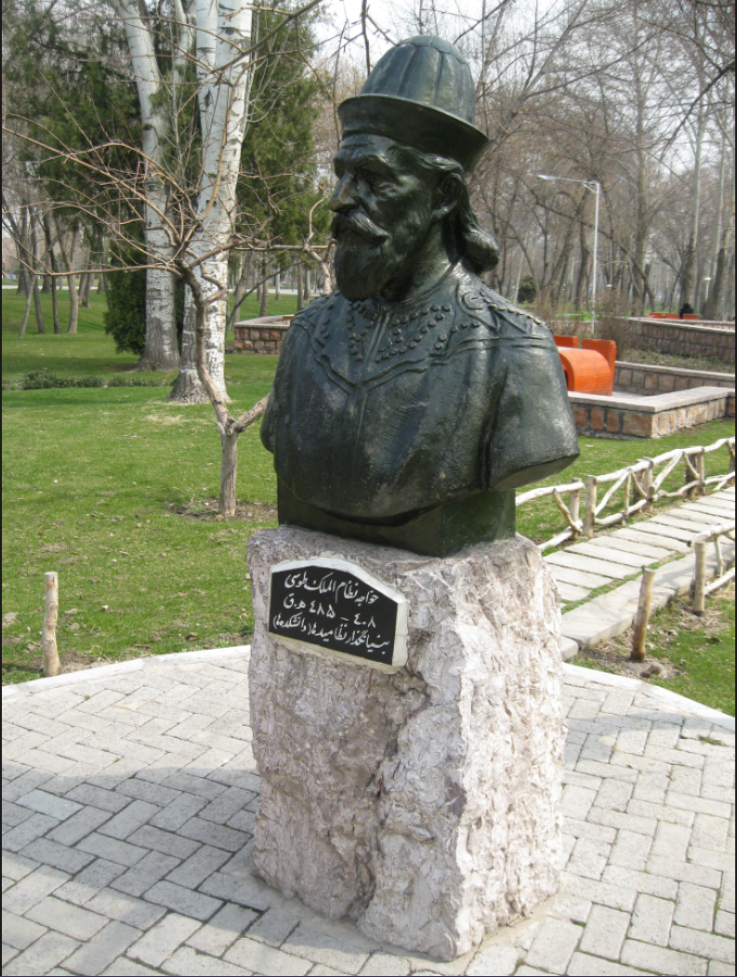
Nizam al-Mulk, vizier

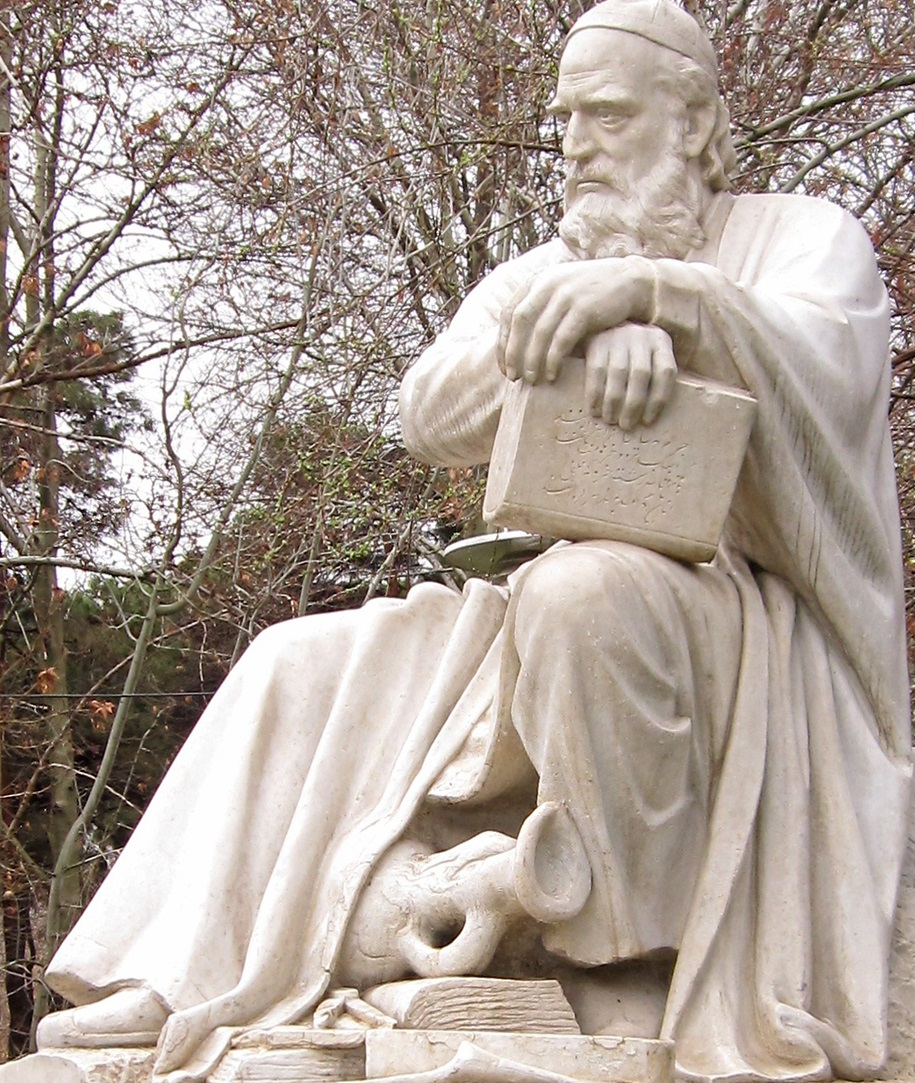
Omar Khayyam, scholar

The medieval tale of the Three Schoolfellows (Persian: سه یار دبستانی) narrates how the vizier Nizam al-Mulk, the Nizari revolutionary Hasan-i Sabbah, and the mathematician-poet Omar Khayyam made a success-sharing pact when they were classmates in their youth, eventually leading to the assassination of the vizier by Hasan's followers, while the third was no longer interested in power.

The tale which is recorded in multiple classical Persian sources is considered folklore by most modern scholars, but some have argued that it is inspired by real events.

== Sources ==
The tale was first attested in the 14th-century Jami' al-tawarikh of Rashid al-Din Hamadani, and later by other Persian authors. It was brought to Western literature by Edward FitzGerald's introduction to his English translation of Rubaiyat of Omar Khayyam. FitzGerald had used Mirkhvand as a source, who in turn had derived a different version of the story from a dubious source, the Wasaya’ of Nizam al-Mulk,

== The tale ==
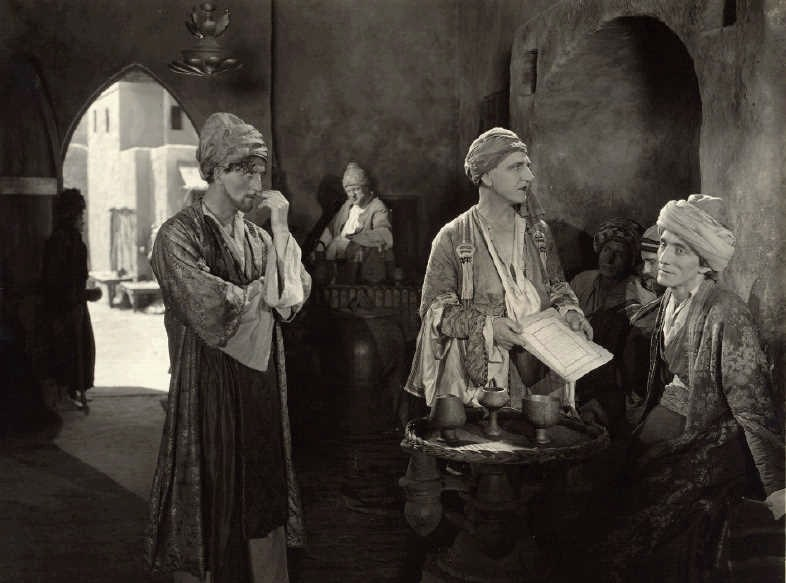
Hassan (Douglas Gerrard), Omar (Guy Bates Post, middle), and Nizam ul Mulk (Nigel De Brulier, seated) in Omar the Tentmaker (1922)

Hasan-i Sabbah, Nizam al-Mulk, and Omar Khayyam were classmates in their youth under the same master, Imam al-Muwaffaq, in the city of Nishapur. Knowing that the students of the Imam often end up reaching high success, they made a pact, proposed by Hasan, that whichever of them rose to prominence first would help the other two.

Rising from a low position, Nizam al-Mulk eventually became the vizier of the Seljuk Empire, and, after being approached by Omar Khayyam, offered the other two provincial governorship, both of whom refused for different reasons: Omar Khayyam, now a scholar, was not interested in a public position and instead accepted a regular stipend and continued his literary and scientific career, while Hasan-i Sabbah ambitiously wanted a higher position in the court itself, which was granted.

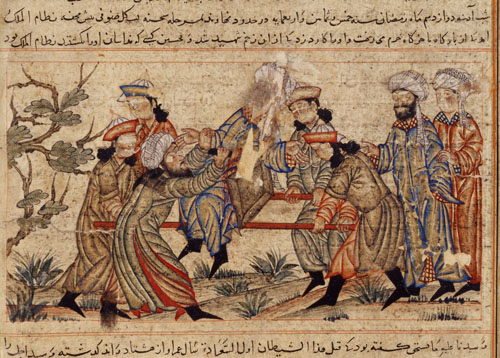
Assassination of Nizam al-Mulk by the Assassins (Hassan's followers)

Hassan was later accused by some for plotting against Nizam al-Mulk to replace him as the vizier, and the latter plotted against Hasan in response, forcing him to flee to Rayy and then to the Ismaili Egypt.

Hassan, now a learned Ismaili scholar, returned secretly to Persia as a missionary and leader of the radical Nizari Ismaili movement. He led a revolt that spread swiftly and resulted in the foundation of a decentralized state consisted of scattered fortresses across the Seljuk empire. Nizam-ul-Mulk, who was planning further campaigns against Nizari strongholds, eventually became the victim of the first and most famous assassination by the followers of Hasan (who later became known as the "Assassins").

== Assessment ==
Most modern scholars consider the story as folklore, due to age discrepancies of the three protagonists as well as their different places of residence during their youth. Nevertheless, Ismaili scholar Ali Mohammad Rajput argues that the story is likely true, noting the school attendance of people at different ages, and the existence of three independent accounts of (parts of) the story. Jawad al-Muscati considers the story a fabrication by Hassan Sabbah's enemies.

According to Harold Bowen, the story may originate from the actual relationship between Nizam al-Mulk and two of his contemporaries: the poet Sayf al-Din Bakharzi and the Seljuk bureaucrat Abu Nasr Kunduri. All of them were close in age and had contact to the Nishapuri teacher Imam al-Muwaffaq. Kunduri was dismissed from his position and was executed, partly due to Nizam al-Mulk's actions, while the latter patronized Bakharzi's poetry.
