= Ahmad ibn Nizam al-Mulk =

12th-century Vizier of the Seljuqs and later Abbasids

Diya al-Mulk Ahmad ibn Nizam al-Mulk

Abbasid Vizier
- In office 1122 - 1123/1124 (one year)
- Monarch: Al-Mustarshid
- Preceded by: Amid al-dawla Jalal al-Din Hasan ibn Ali

Seljuk Vizier
- In office 1106/1107 - 1110/1111
- Monarch: Muhammad I Tapar
- Succeeded by: Shams al-Mulk Uthman

Personal details
- Born: Balkh
- Died: 1149/1150 CE Baghdad, Abbasid Caliphate (now Iraq)
- Spouse: unknown
- Children: unknown
- Parent(s): Father: Nizam al-Mulk; Mother: Georgian princess, niece or daughter of Bagrat III
- Relatives: Brothers: Shams al-Mulk Uthman; Abulfath Fakhr al-Malik; Mu'ayyid al-Mulk; Jamal al-Mulk; Fakhr al-Mulk; Izz al-Mulk; Imad al-Mulk Abu'l-Kasim; Safiyya (sister)

Ḍiyaʾ al-Mulk Aḥmad ibn Niẓām al-Mulk (Persian: ضیاءالملک احمد بن نظام‌الملک), was a Persian vizier of the Seljuq Empire and then the Abbasid Caliphate. He was the son of Nizam al-Mulk, one of the most famous viziers of the Seljuq Empire.

== Biography ==
Ahmad was born in Balkh, he was the son of Nizam al-Mulk, and a Georgian princess, who was the niece or daughter of Bagrat III of Georgia. During the lifetime of his father, Ahmad lived in Hamadan and Isfahan, and continued to do so in a few years after his father's death.

In 1106/1107, he went to the court of Sultan Muhammad I to file a complaint against the rais (head) of Hamadan. When Ahmad arrived to the court, Muhammad I appointed him as his vizier, replacing Sa'd al-Mulk Abu'l-Mahasen Abi who had been recently executed on suspicion of heresy. The appointment was due mainly to the reputation of his Ahmad's father. He was then given various titles which his father held (Qewam al-din, Sadr al-Islam and Nizam al-Mulk).

Ahmad was vizier for four years in which he in 1107/1108 accompanied Sultan Muhammad I during his campaign in Iraq, where his army managed to defeat and kill the Mazyadid ruler Sadaqa ibn Mansur, who bore the title "king of the Arabs". In 1109, Muhammad I sent Ahmad and Chavli Saqavu to capture the Ismaili fortresses of Alamut and Ostavand, but they failed to achieve any decisive result and withdrew. In 1110, an Ismaili attempted to assassinate Ahmad in a mosque at Baghdad, but failed to do so. Ahmad was shortly replaced by Khatir al-Mulk Abu Mansur Maybudi as vizier of the Sejluq Empire. According to Ali ibn al-Athir, Ahmad then retired to a private life in Baghdad, but according to Anushirvan ibn Khalid, Muhammad I had Ahmad imprisoned for ten years.

In 1122, the son of Muhammad I, Mahmud II was ruling as the Sultan of the Seljuq Empire, with another son of Nizam al-Mulk, Shams al-Mulk Uthman, as his vizier. During the same year, the Abbasid caliph al-Mustarshid deposed and imprisoned his vizier Amid al-dawla Jalal al-Din Hasan ibn Ali. Mahmud II then imposed Ahmad as al-Mustarshid's vizier. Ahmad later fought against the Mazyadid Dubays ibn Sadaqa. Ahmad also fortified the walls around Baghdad.

One year later, Mahmud II removed Shams al-Mulk Uthman as his vizier, and had him executed. The Abbasid caliph then used this opportunity to get rid of Ahmad as his vizier. Ahmad then retired to a school founded by his father, the Nizamiyya of Baghdad, where he lived the last 25 years of his life, dying in 1149/1150.

== See also ==
- Malik Shah I
- Omar Khayyam

== Sources ==
- Bosworth, C. E. (1968). "The Political and Dynastic History of the Iranian World (A.D. 1000–1217)". In Boyle, John Andrew (ed.). The Cambridge History of Iran: The Saljuq and Mongol Periods. Vol. 5. Cambridge: Cambridge University Press. pp. 1–202. ISBN 0-521-06936-X.
- C. L. Klausner, The Seljuk Vizierate, a Study of Civil Administration 1055-1194, Cambridge, Massachusetts, 1973
- Bosworth, C. Edmund (1984). "AḤMAD B. NEẒĀM-AL-MOLK". Encyclopaedia Iranica, Vol. I, Fasc. 6. London et al.: C. Edmund Bosworth. pp. 642–643.

Preceded by Sa'd al-Mulk Abu'l-Mahasen Abi	Vizier of the Seljuq Empire; 1106/1107–1010/1011	Succeeded by Khatir al-Mulk Abu Mansur Maybudi
Preceded by Amid al-dawla Jalal al-Din Hasan ibn Ali	Abbasid vizier 1122–1123	Unknown
