= Nizam al-Mulk =

Persian scholar and vizier of the Seljuk Empire (1018–1092)

- نظام‌الملک
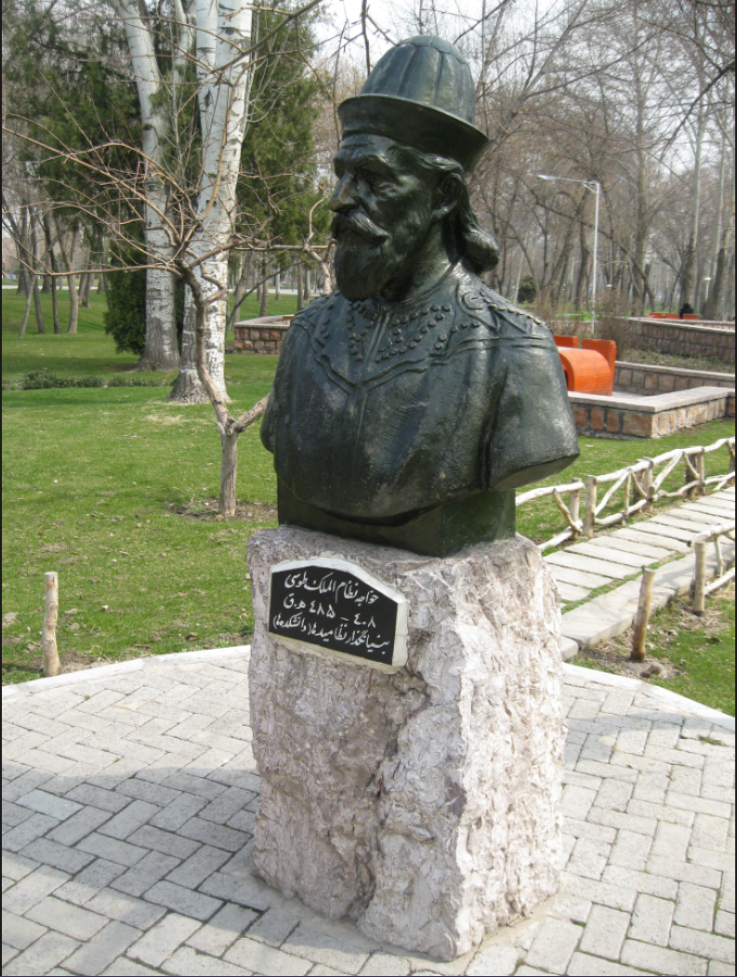
- Bust of Nizam in Mashhad

Vizier of the Seljuk Empire
- In office 29 November 1064 – 14 October 1092
- Monarch: Alp Arslan (1063–1072); Malik Shah I (1072–1092)
- Preceded by: Al-Kunduri
- Succeeded by: Taj al-Mulk Abu'l Ghana'im
- Born: 10 April 1018; Tus, Ghaznavid Empire
- Died: 14 October 1092 (aged 74); Nahavand, Seljuk Empire
- Burial place: Tomb of Nizam al-Mulk, Isfahan, Iran
- Spouse: Unnamed Bagrationi princess
- Children: Ahmad ibn Nizam al-Mulk; Shams al-Mulk Uthman; Abulfath Fakhr al-Malik; Mu'ayyid al-Mulk; Jamal al-Mulk; Fakhr al-Mulk; Izz al-Mulk; Imad al-Mulk Abu'l-Kasim; Safiyya
- Father: Ali ibn Ishak

Abū ʿAlī al-Ḥasan ibn ʿAlī Ṭūsī (Persian: ابوعلی حسن بن علی طوسی) (1018 – 1092), better known by his honorific title of Niẓām al-Mulk (Persian: نظام‌الملک, lit. 'Orderer of the Realm'), was a Persian Sunni scholar, jurist, and vizier and military commander of the Seljuk Empire. Rising from a low position within the empire, he became the de facto ruler of the realm for 20 years after the assassination of Sultan Alp Arslan in 1072, and is often portrayed in Persianate historical traditions as the archetypal "good vizier". Widely regarded as one of the most influential statesmen in medieval Islamic history, the administrative policies and bureaucratic frameworks formalized by Nizam al-Mulk deeply influenced Perso-Islamic statecraft for centuries.

One of his most important legacies was the founding of a system of madrasas in cities across the Seljuk Empire which were called the Nizamiyyas after him. He is also traditionally credited with authoring the Siyasatnama (Book of Government), a political and administrative treatise that uses historical anecdotes to pragmatically discuss justice, effective rule, and the role of the bureaucracy in Islamic society.

== Early life and service to the Ghaznavids ==
=== Reason for naming ===
Two days after his birth, his mother saw in a dream a woman of dignity and majesty sitting on a chair with a Quran by her side, holding a child. When she asked about her, she was told: She is Fatima al-Zahra. She greeted her and kept her distance out of respect for her. When the righteous woman saw her, she allowed her to approach, and she took her son and breastfed him. She inquired about his name, and when she learned that he had not yet been named and that his father's name was "Ali Hasan," she said: "Name him 'Hasan,' like my son, for he has a father named Ali" . In the morning, she recounted her dream to his father and gave her newborn that name.

=== Early life ===
Abu Ali Hasan was born on 10 April 1018, in a small village named Radkan, near Tus, in Iran, to a dehqan family. Growing up he studied Shafi fiqh and the Ashari school of theology. His father Ali ibn Ishak served as a financial officer to the Ghaznavids. However, when the Seljuk Turks defeated the Ghaznavids at the Battle of Dandanaqan in 1040, and conquered Khorasan, Abu Ali Hasan's father fled to Ghazni(in present-day Afghanistan), took Tusi with him & remained there. In 1050, the Seljuks then extended their rule as far as Vakhsh and appointed a certain Abu 'Ali ibn Shadhan as the governor of their new conquests (Balkh). In 1052- Due to utter chaos and confusion amid assassination of Sultan Abdul Rashid by slave commander Toghrul, Abu Ali Hasan left the Ghaznavid court and escaped to Balk (Left the Ghaznavids and shifted his allegiance to the Seljuk dynasty, entering the service of Abu Ali ibn Shadhan governor of Balkh (Empire of Chaghri Beg)

Background

(The rogue slave-commander Toghrul usurped the throne, assassinated Sultan Abdul Rashid, and slaughtered eleven other Ghaznavid princes. With Ghazna under his control, Toghrul sent letters to the ghulam general Kirghiz, commander of the Ghaznavid forces in India, seeking his support. Kirghiz responded by condemning Toghrul and his massacre of the Ghaznavid princes. Meanwhile, Toghrul married Mas'ud I's daughter to legitimise his reign and started minting coins in his image. Despite this, Kirghiz sent letters to the garrison and army commanders which motivated a ghulam named Nushtigin to murder Toghrul. By the time Kirghiz and his army arrived, Toghrul's head was being paraded around Ghazna )

== Service to the Seljuks ==
=== Reign of Tughril and Alp Arslan ===
Around the year 1043, Abu Ali Hasan stopped serving the Ghaznavids and entered the service of the Seljuk Turks. He later became the chief administrator of the entire Khorasan province by 1059. When Tughril died childless in the city of Ray, he was succeeded by his nephew Suleiman which was contested by Alp Arslan, both of them sons of Tughril's brother Chaghri. His cousin Kutalmish, who had both been a vital part of his campaigns and later a supporter of Yinal's rebellion, also put forth a claim. Alp Arslan, with the aid of Abu Ali Hasan, defeated Kutalmish and succeeded him on 27 April 1064.

After Alp Arslan had consolidated his power in the Sejluk realm, he appointed Abu Ali Hasan as his vizier, who would remain in that position throughout the reigns of Alp Arslan (1063–1072) and Malik-Shah I (1072–1092). Abu Ali Hasan was also given the title of "Nizam al-Mulk" ("Order of the Realm").

Alp Arslan's strength lies in the military realm. Domestic affairs were handled by Nizam al-Mulk, who also founded the administrative organization that characterized and strengthened the sultanate during the reigns of Alp Arslan and his son, Malik Shah I. Military iqtā' (fiefs), governed by Seljuk princes, were established to provide support for the soldiery and to accommodate the nomadic Turks to the established Anatolian agricultural scene. This type of military fiefdom enabled the nomadic Turks to draw on the resources of the sedentary Iranians and other established cultures within the Seljuk realm, and allowed Alp Arslan to field a huge standing army without depending on tribute from conquest to pay his soldiers. He not only had enough food from his subjects to maintain his military, but the taxes collected from traders and merchants added to his coffers sufficiently to fund his continuous wars.

Nizam accompanied Alp Arslan in all his campaigns and journeys, except for a few. In February/March 1064, Alp Arslan, along with his son Malik-Shah I and Nizam al-Mulk, campaigned in Byzantine Armenia, where they managed to capture Ani. Several minor rulers then acknowledged Seljuk authority, while Alp Arslan and Nizam continued to penetrate deeper into the Caucasus, reaching Georgia. The Georgian ruler Bagrat IV, managed to make peace with Alp Arslan by giving his niece to him in marriage.

Nizam also made some expeditions on his own and conquered the citadel of Estakhr from the Shabankara chieftain Fadluya in 1067, and made another expedition in Fars. These successful conquests are said to have greatly increased his reputation. On 26 August 1071, the decisive Battle of Manzikert was fought, which Nizam al-Mulk had missed because he had been sent to Persia with a convoy of materials.

=== Reign of Malik Shah I ===
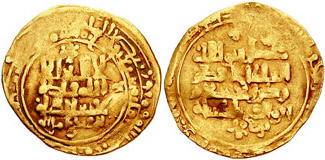
Coin minted during the reign of Malik-Shah I.

Following Alp Arslan's assassination in 1072, Malik-Shah I was challenged in battle by his uncle, Kavurt. In January 1074, their armies met near Hamadan. Kavurt's troops consisted of the traditional Turkmen elements from Alp Arslan's army, while Malik's consisted of ghulams and contingents of Kurdish and Arab troops. Due to Turkmen defections to Malik's army, Kavurt was defeated and, despite Malik's consideration for mercy, later poisoned, presumably on the orders of Nizam al-Mulk.

Under Nizam's excellent guidance the Seljuk armies contained the Ghaznavids in Khorasan, rolled back the Fatimids in Syria, defeated other Seljuk pretenders to the throne, invaded Georgia and reduced it to a tributary state, compelled the submission of regional governors, and kept the Abbasid Caliphs in a position of impotence.

Nizam al-Mulk left a great mark on the organization of the Seljuk governmental bodies and hence the title Nizam al-Mulk which translates as "Order of the Realm." He bridged political gaps among the Abbasids, the Seljuks, and their various rivals such as the Fatimids. The Seljuk military was heavily mixed of different ethnicity, including Turks, Armenians, Greeks, Arabs, and Slavs. Nizam, however, favored Iranian soldiers, such as the Dailamites, Khorasanis, and the Shabankara. He also favored non-Iranian soldiers such as the Georgians.

Nizam al-Mulk's many political objectives included:

- Creating an employment opportunity for the Turkmens, who had immigrated to the Iranian plateau during the Seljuk successes in Persia, the nomadic way of life of the Turkmens represented a significant threat to the political and economic stability of the country.
- Demonstrating the power of the Sultan (i.e. the strength and mobility of his forces, but also his grace towards docile rebels).
- Maintaining local Sunni and Shiite rulers as vassals of the Sultan and the increased use of relatives of the Sultan as provincial governors.
- Preventing dissents over the succession of Malik-Shah I.
- Maintaining good relations with the Abbasid Caliphate.

In 1081/1082, Ibn Bahmanyar, one of the many enemies of Nizam, tried to poison him, but failed and was blinded by Nizam. After the blinding of Ibn Bahmanyar, the enemies of Nizam made false stories about him and his son. This greatly angered Nizam's son Jamal al-Mulk, who tore out the tongue of Ja'farak, one of the perpetrators of the false stories. Malik Shah had no power to intervene in the event, but instead had Jamal poisoned.

In 1091, a group of Qarmatians sacked Basra, while the Isma'ilis under the leadership of Hassan-i Sabbah seized the fortress of Alamut, starting a revolt. Moreover, the succession to the sultanate was complicated by the death of two of Malik-Shah's eldest sons: Dawud (died 1082) and Ahmad (died 1088), whom both were sons of the Kara-Khanid Princess Terken Khatun. She also had a son named Mahmud (born 1087) whom she wanted to succeed his father, while Nizam and most of the Seljuk army was in favor of Berkyaruq, the oldest of all Malik-Shah's living sons and born to a Seljuk princess. Terken Khatun then allied with Taj al-Mulk Abu'l Ghana'im to try to remove Nizam from his post. Taj even accused Nizam of corruption before the sultan. Malik Shah I, however, did not dare to dismiss Nizam. Nizam later besieged Alamut, but was forced to withdraw.

In 1092, Nizam, just before his death, knowing that his enemies were planning plots against him, made a famous speech at the court:

Tell the Sultan, If you have not already realized that I am your co-equal in the work of ruling, then know that you have only attained to this power through my statesmanship and judgement. Does he not remember when his father was killed, and I assumed responsibility for the conduct of affairs and crushed the rebels who reared their heads, from his own family and from elsewhere. Tell him that the stability of that regal cap is bound up with this vizierial inkstand, and that the harmony of these two interests is the means of securing all objects soughts after and the ultimate cause of all objects gained. If ever I close up this inkstand, that royal power will topple.

== Piety ==
It was said that he never sat except in a state of ablution, and he never performed ablution without performing supererogatory prayer. He used to fast on Mondays and Thursdays. He revitalized the architecture of Khwarazm and the shrine of Tus, and established a hospital for which he spent fifty thousand dinars. He also built a school in Marv, a school in Bukhara, a school in Balkh, a school in Basra, and a school in Isfahan. He was forbearing, dignified, and eloquent, a man of chivalry, tolerance, and abundant charity. He would go to great lengths in showing humility to prisoners.

It was said that he would give in charity every morning one hundred dinars.

=== Affinity for Sufism ===
Nizam was known for his great affinity for the sufis that frequented his court. When asked why he showed them so much favor, Nizam replied:

I was in the service of a certain amir, when a sufi came to me and made me a pious exhortation, and said: "Serve Him whose service will be useful to you, and be not taken up with one whom dogs will eat tomorrow." I did not understand his meaning; but the amir used to drink from morning to evening, and had some dogs which were ferocious like beasts of prey, and devoured strangers at night; now, it happened that being once overcome with intoxication, he went out alone, and was torn to pieces by the dogs, which did not recognize him. I then knew that this sufi had received a revelation on the subject, and I therefore treat these people with respect, in hopes that I may obtain a similar grace

=== Affinity for Islamic Scholarship ===
Whenever he was visited by scholars such as Imam al-Ḥaramayn Abu al-Maʿālī, and Abu al-Qāsim al-Qushayrī he treated them with the utmost respect and made them sit down on the sofa with himself.

== Works ==
Aside from his extraordinary influence as vizier with full authority, he is also well known for systematically founding a number of schools of higher education in several cities like Baghdad, Isfahan, Amol, Nishapur, Mosul, Basra, and Herat, the famous Nizamiyyas, which were named after him.

Nizam al-Mulk is also widely known for his voluminous treatise on kingship titled Siyasatnama (Book of Government) which was written after Malik Shah had requested that his ministers produce books on government, administration and the troubles facing the nation. However, the treatise made by Nizam was the only one to receive approval and was consequently accepted as forming "the law of the constitution of the nation". The treatise uses historical examples to discuss justice, effective rule, and the role of government in Islamic society, and has been compared to Machiavelli's The Prince. The work also discusses various aspects of state surveillance and spying, advising rulers to establish an extensive espionage network.

He also wrote a book titled Dastur al-Wuzarā, written for his son, Abu'l-Fath Fakhr al-Malik, which is not dissimilar to the famous book of Qabus nama.

== Death ==
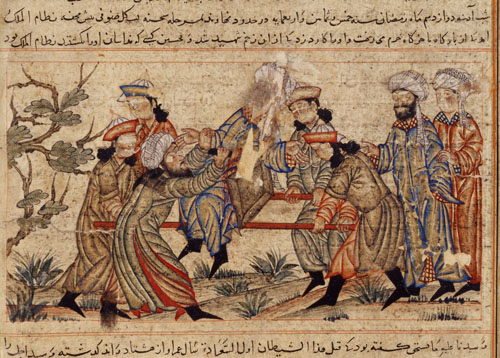
Artwork of Nizam's assassination, miniature from the Jami' al-tawarikh of Rashid al-Din Hamadani

Nizam al-Mulk was assassinated en route from Isfahan to Baghdad on 10 Ramadan 485 A.H. (14 October 1092) The mainstream literature says he was stabbed by the dagger of a member of the Assassins, sent by the notorious Hassan-i Sabbah near Nahavand, as he was being carried on his litter. The killer approached him disguised as a Sufi.

This account is particularly interesting in light of a possibly apocryphal story of the "Three Schoolfellows" that first appeared in English in the introduction to Edward Fitzgerald's translation of the Rubaiyat of Omar Khayyam. In this story a pact is formed between a young Nizam al-Mulk (at that time known as Abdul Khassem) and his two friends, Omar Khayyam and Hassan-i-Sabbah. Their agreement stated that if one should rise to prominence, that they would help the other two to do likewise. Nizam al-Mulk was the first to do this when he was appointed vizier to the sultan Alp Arslan. To fulfill the pact he offered both friends positions of rank within the court. Omar refused the offer, asking instead to be given the means to continue his studies indefinitely. This Nizam did, as well as building him an observatory. Although Hassan, unlike Omar, decided to accept the appointment offered to him, he was forced to flee after plotting to depose Nizam as vizier. Subsequently, Hassan came upon and conquered the fortress of Alamut, from where he established the Assassins. According to Bernard Lewis, this tale is unlikely to be true because Hassan-i Sabbah died in 1124, and Omar Khayyam in 1123 at the earliest. Since Nizam al-Mulk was born in 1020 at the latest, the three were not of similar ages and were probably not students together.

== Legacy ==
Nizam al-Mulk was a skilled and effective vizier, he represented the majesty, splendor and hospitality of the Barmakids, historians and poets describe him as a great organizer and an ideal soldier and scholar. Because of his talents, it was possible for the Seljuk Turks to establish a powerful empire in their new home. Nizam was not only the leader of the Persian-dominated bureaucracy (divan), but was also an atabeg who served in the royal court (dadgar) and played an important role between the politically and culturally different Iranians and Turks. He was also responsible for establishing distinctly Persian forms of government and administration which would last for centuries. Because of his excellent tutorship and close friendship with Malik-Shah, he was usually called "father" by him. He was even greatly respected by his ghulams, who, after the death of Nizam, took revenge on several of his rivals, such as Taj al-Mulk Abu'l Ghana'im.

Even after his death his family continued to play an important role in the Seljuk Empire. He was married to a niece or daughter of Bagrat IV of Georgia, who had previously been married or betrothed to Alp Arslan. All of his twelve sons held important offices in the Seljuk Empire, the most prominent of his sons were: Ahmad ibn Nizam al-Mulk, served as the vizier of the Seljuk Sultan Muhammad I Tapar and the Abbasid caliph al-Mustarshid; Shams al-Mulk Uthman was the governor of Merv and head of the Seljuk military; Fakhr al-Mulk served as the vizier of Berkyaruq and Muhammad I Tapar; Jamal al-Mulk (who died before Nizam) served as the governor of Balkh; Izz al-Mulk and Mu'ayyid al-Mulk served as viziers of Berkyaruq; Imad al-Mulk Abu'l-Kasim served as the vizier of the Seljuk governor of Balkh.

== See also ==
- Three Schoolfellows

== Bibliography ==
- Bosworth, C. E. (1968). "The Political and Dynastic History of the Iranian World (A.D. 1000–1217)". In Boyle, John Andrew (ed.). The Cambridge History of Iran: The Saljuq and Mongol Periods. Vol. 5. Cambridge: Cambridge University Press. pp. 1–202. ISBN 0-521-06936-X.
- Bosworth, C. E. (1984). "AḤMAD B. NEẒĀM-AL-MOLK". Encyclopaedia Iranica. Vol. I, Fasc. 6. London. pp. 642–643.
- Bowen, H. & Bosworth, C. E. (1995). "Niẓām al-Mulk". In Bosworth, C. E.; van Donzel, E.; Heinrichs, W. P. & Lecomte, G. (eds.). The Encyclopaedia of Islam, Second Edition. Volume VIII: Ned–Sam. Leiden: E. J. Brill. pp. 69–73. ISBN 978-90-04-09834-3.
- Tafazzoli, Ahmad (1994). "DEHQĀN". Encyclopaedia Iranica. Vol. VII, Fasc. 2 and Vol. VII, Fasc. 3. Ahmad Tafazzoli. pp. 223–226.
- Yavari, Neguin (2015). "NEẒĀM-AL-MOLK". Encyclopaedia Iranica.
- Nizam al-Mulk (2002) [1960]. The Book of Government Or Rules for Kings: The Siyar al-Muluk or Siyasat-nama of Nizam al-Mulk. Translated by Darke, Hubert. Routledge. ISBN 0700712283 – via Google Books.

Preceded by Al-Kunduri	Vizier of the Great Seljuq Empire; 29 November 1064 – 14 October 1092	Succeeded by Taj al-Mulk Abu'l Ghana'im
