= History of Nizari Isma'ilism =

The History of Nizari Isma'ilism from the founding of Islam covers a period of over 1400 years. It begins with Muhammad's mission to restore to humanity the universality and knowledge of the oneness of the divine within the Abrahamic tradition, through the final message and what the Shia believe was the appointment of Ali as successor and guardian of that message with both the spiritual and temporal authority of Muhammad through the institution of the Imamate.

A few months before his death, Muhammad, who resided in the city of Medina, made his first and final pilgrimage to Mecca, the Farewell Pilgrimage. There, atop Mount Arafat, he addressed the Muslim masses in what came to be known as the Farewell Sermon. After completion of the Hajj pilgrimage, Muhammad journeyed back toward his home in Medina with the other pilgrims. During the journey, Muhammad stopped at the desert oasis of Khumm, and requested other pilgrims gather together, and there he addressed them with the famous words: "Whose mawla (master) I am, this Ali is also his mawla. O God, befriend whosoever befriends him and be the enemy of whosoever is hostile to him." This is known as the event of Ghadir Khumm, which is remembered in the hadith of the pond of Khumm.

Following Muhammad's death the Shia or "Party" of Ali believed he had been designated not merely as the political successor to Muhammad ("Caliph") but also his spiritual successor ("Imam"). And looked toward Ali and his most trusted supporters for both political and spiritual guidance. Ali's descendants were also the only descendants of Muhammad as Ali had married Muhammad's only surviving progeny, his daughter Fatimah. Through the generations, the mantle of leadership of the Shia passed through the progeny of Ali and Fatimah, the Ahl al-Bayt, embodied in the head of the family, the Imam. Both Ismaʿili and Twelver Shia accept the same initial Imams from the descendants of Muhammad through his daughter Fatimah and therefore share much of their early history; the Zaydi are distinct.

The modern Nizari faith refers to itself as a tariqa or "path", the term for a Sufi order, following centuries hiding from oppression as a Twelver Nimatullahi tariqa.

== Imami Shia ==
Ja'far al-Sadiq was acknowledged leader (Imam) of the Shia and head of the Ahl al-Bayt. A highly accomplished theologian, Ja'far tutored Abu Hanifa, who would go on to found the Hanafi madhhab ("school of jurisprudence"), the largest Sunni legal school practiced today; Malik ibn Anas, founder of the Maliki Sunni madhhab; and Wasil ibn Ata, who founded the Muʿtazila theology.

During a period of rapid change, when Muslims no longer threatened were beginning to concern themselves with questions like "what does it mean to be a Muslim?". Most sought answers from the new learned classes which would eventually develop into Sunni Islam, but for some the answers to such questions were always sought from the Ahl al-Bayt led by Imam Jaʿfar; who saw the need for a systematic school of thought for those who sought guidance, and were loyal to Muhammad's family, as distinct from the new scholar schools which would synthesize into Sunni Islam. His answer was Ja'fari jurisprudence, a madhhab "school of jurisprudence" distinct to the Shia. This period marks the founding of the distinct religious views of both the Shia and the Sunni.

== Imami Schism ==
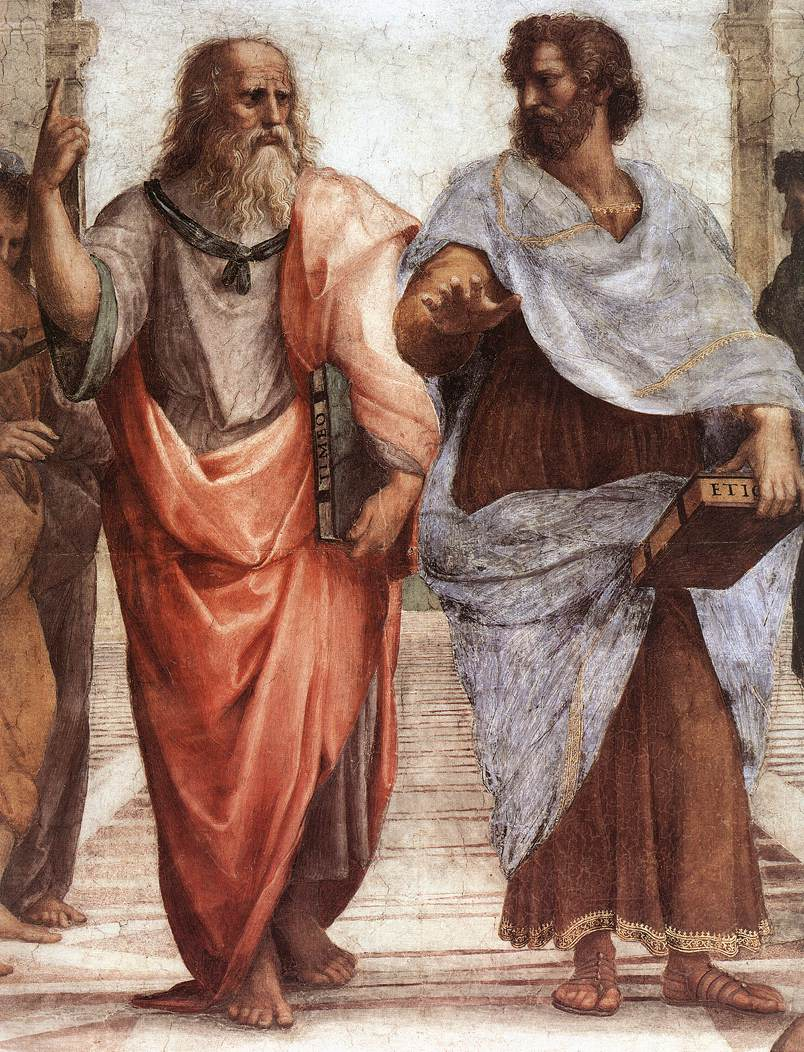
A fresco by Raphael depicting Aristotle and Plato; Greek philosophy played a pivotal role in the formation of the Isma'ili school of thought.

Ja'far al-Sadiq was married to Faṭimah, herself a member of the Ahl al-Bayt. Together they had two sons, Ismā'īl al-Mubarak and his elder brother, Abdullah al-Aftah. Following Fatimah's death, Ja'far al-Sadiq was said to be so devastated he refused to ever remarry.

The majority of available sources – both Ismā'īli and Twelver as well as Sunni – indicate that Imam Jafar as-Sadiq designated Ismā'īl as his successor and the next Imam after him through nass ("a clear legal injunction") and there is no doubt concerning the authenticity of this designation. However, it is controversially believed that Ismā'īl predeceased his father. However, the same sources report Ismā'īl being seen three days after in Basra. His closest supporters believed Ismail had gone into hiding to protect his life. Therefore, upon as-Sadiq's death, a group of Jafar al-Sadiq's followers turned to his eldest surviving son, Abdullah because he was the son of the daughter of the Caliph and the oldest son of Jafar al-Sadiq after Ismā'īl's death. He claimed a second designation following Ismā'īl's disappearance. Later most of them went back to the doctrine of the Imamate of his brother, Musa, together with the evidence for the right of the latter and the clear proofs of his Immmate (i.e. his character) When Abd-Allah died within weeks without an heir, many more turned again to another son of as-Sadiq, Musa al-Kadhim, a son from a slave named Umm Hamida, who Ja'far had taken after his wife's death. While some had already accepted him as the Imam following the death of Jafar as-Sadiq, Abdullah's supporters now aligned themselves with him giving him the majority of the Shia.

Isma'ilis argue that since a defining quality of an Imam is his infallibility, Ja'far as-Sadiq could not have mistakenly passed his nass on to someone who would be either unfit or predecease him. Therefore, the Imam after Ismā'īl was his eldest son Muhammad ibn Ismā'īl, known as al-Maktūm.

=== The Early Imams ===
- Ali (599–661)
- Hasan ibn Ali (625–670)
- Husayn ibn Ali (626–680)
- Ali ibn Husayn Zayn al-Abidin (659–712)
- Muhammad al-Baqir (676–743) * Offshoot of Zaydiyyah
- Ja'far al-Sadiq (702–765) * Offshoot of Twelvers
- Isma'il ibn Jafar (721–762)
- Muhammad ibn Ismail (740–813) * Offshoot of Sevener Qarmatians

=== Callers to Islam ===
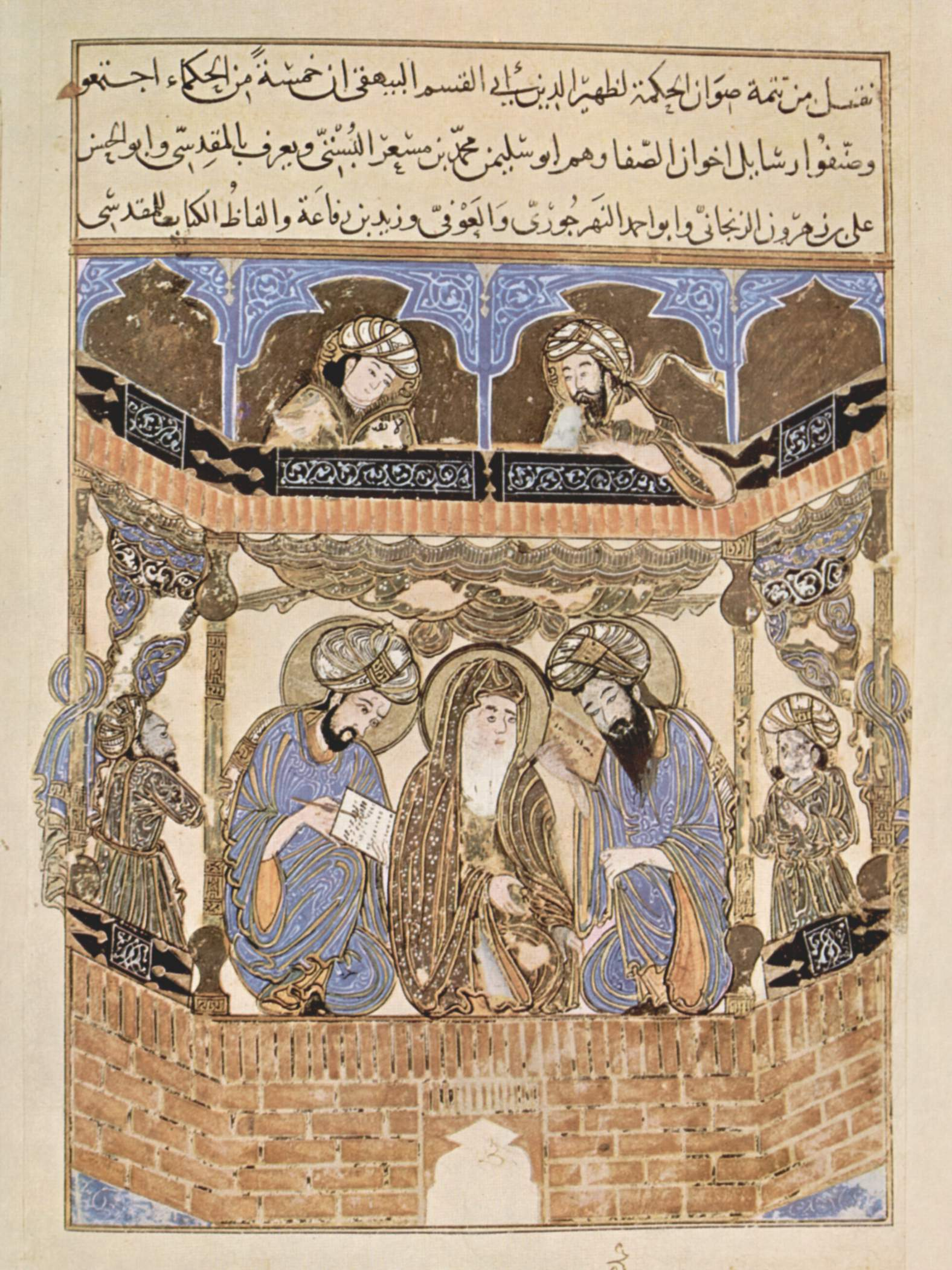
Arabic manuscript from the 12th century for Brethren of Purity (Arabic, Ikhwan al-Safa اخوان الصفا)

Imam Muhammad al-Maktūm retained Ismā'īl's closest supporters, who were few in number but highly disciplined, consisting of philosophers, scientists, and theologians; like his father Imam Muhammad retained an interest in Greek philosophy, political, and scientific thought. Muhmmad al-Maktūm was himself several years the senior of his half-uncle, Musa al-Kadhim. Muhammad al-Maktūm reconciled with Musa al-Kadhim and left Medina with his father's most loyal supporters, effectively disappearing from historical records and instituting an era of Dar al-Satr (epoch of veiling) when the Imams would vanish from public view. There followed a period when mysterious intellectual writings of an Isma'ili character appeared, most famously the Rasa'il Ikhwan al-safa (the epistles of Brethren of Purity) an enormous compendium of 52 epistles dealing with a wide variety of subjects including mathematics, natural sciences, psychology (psychical sciences) and theology. Isma'ili leadership also produced an array of propaganda attacking the political and religious establishments with calls for popular revolution, through a dāʻwah propagation machine called "Callers to Islam". This distinctive characteristic of the Isma'ili to challenge established social, economic, and intellectual norms with their vision of a just society was opposed directly opposed to Twelver quietism and political apathy and would be a hallmark of Isma'ili history.

First Period of Concealment: The Isma'ilis leave Mecca and propagate their faith in secret, and produce literature against the established state.

8. Abdallah al Wafī Aḥmad, son of Muhammad.

9. Aḥmad at Taqī Muḥammad, son of ʿAbd Allāh.

10. Ḥusayn ar Radhī ad-dīn ʿAbd Allāh, son of Aḥmad.

=== The Fatimid Caliphate ===
In the face of persecution, the bulk of the Isma'ili continued to recognize Imams who, as mentioned, secretly propagated their faith through Duʻāt (singular, dāʻī) "Callers to Islām" from their bases in Syria. However, by the 10th century, an Isma'ili Imam, Abdullah al-Mahdi Billah, correctly known as ʻAbdu l-Lāh al-Mahdī, had emigrated to North Africa and successfully established the Fatimid Caliphate in Tunisia. His successors subsequently succeeded in conquering all of North Africa (including highly prized Egypt) and the Fertile Crescent, and even holding Mecca and Medina in Arabia. The capital for the Fatimid state subsequently shifted to the newly founded city of Cairo (al-Qāhirah, meaning "The Victorious"), in honour of the Isma'ili military victories, from which the Fatimid Caliph-Imams ruled for several generations, establishing their new city as a centre for culture and civilization. It boasted the world's first university, Al-Azhar University and the House of Knowledge, where the study of mathematics, art, biology, and philosophy reached new heights in the known world.

A fundamental split amongst the Isma'ili occurred as the result of a dispute over which son should succeed the 18th Imam and Fatimid caliph al-Mustansir Billah. While Nizar was originally designated Imam, his younger brother al-Musta'li was promptly installed as Imam in Cairo with the help of the powerful Armenian vizier, Badr al-Jamali, whose daughter he was married to. Badr al-Jamali claimed that Imam Mustansir had changed his choice of successor upon his death bed, appointing his younger son.

Although Nizar contested this claim, he was defeated after a short military campaign and imprisoned; however, he did gain support from an Isma'ili Dāʿī based in Iran, Hassan-i Sabbah. Hassan-i Sabbah is noted by Western writers to have been the leader of the legendary "Assassins".

==== Fatimid Caliphs ====
The Nizari Ism'ailis recognize only the first eight Fatimid caliphs from the nine listed below:

- Abdullah al-Mahdi Billah (909–934), founder of the Fatimid dynasty
- al-Qa'im bi-Amr Allah (934–946)
- al-Mansur bi-Nasr Allah (946–953)
- al-Mu'izz li-Din Allah (953–975) Egypt is conquered during his reign
- al-Aziz Billah (975–996)
- al-Hakim bi-Amr Allah (996–1021) * Offshoot of the Druze
- Ali az-Zahir (1021–1036)
- al-Mustansir Billah (1036–1094)
- al-Musta'li (1094–1101) Quarrels over his accession led to the Nizari split. For further information see Musta'li Isma'ilism and Tayyibi Isma'ilism
- Nizar ibn al-Mustansir (1045–1095) Fled to Alexandria and rose in revolt but was defeated and executed in Cairo.

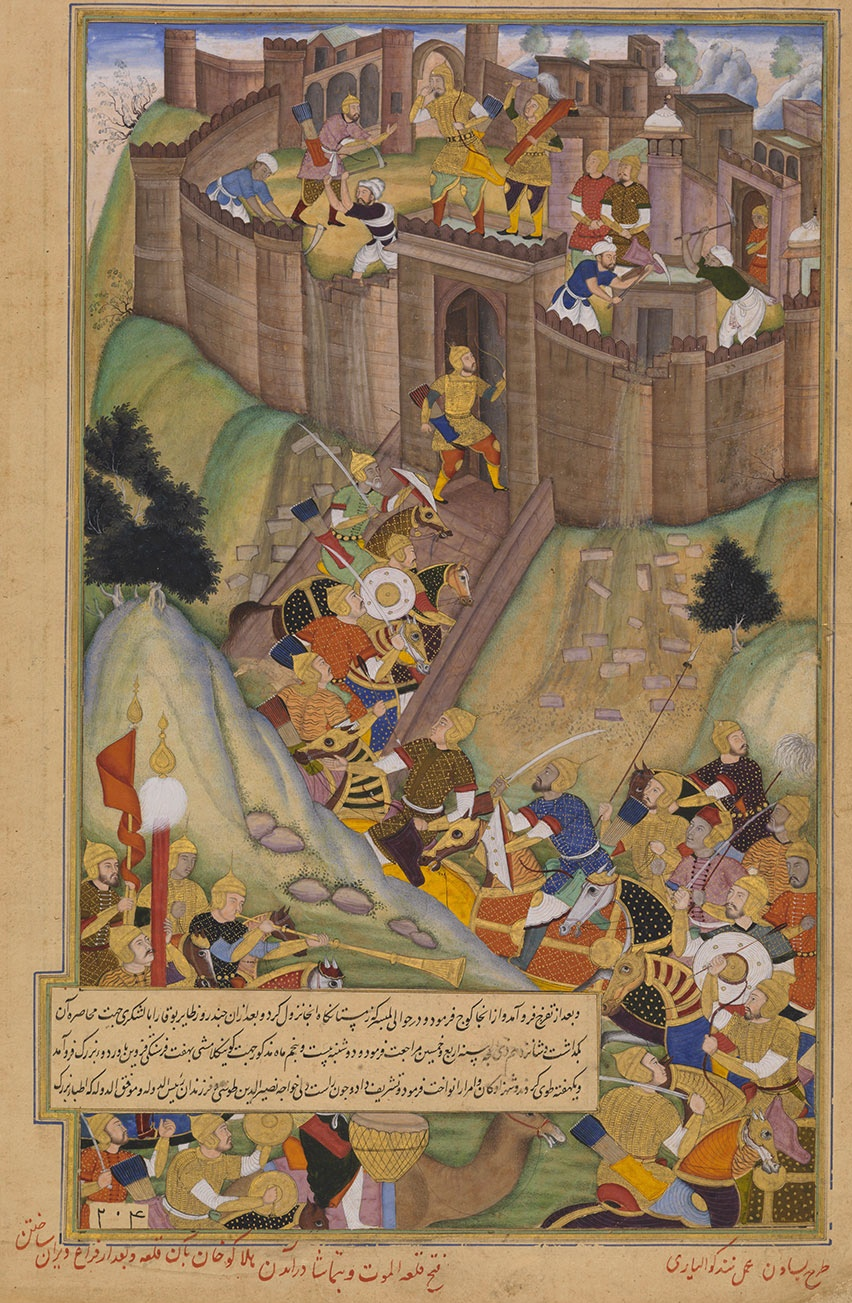
Medieval depiction the fortress of Alamut.

=== Alamut ===
Most Isma'ilis outside North Africa, mostly in Iran and the Levant, came to acknowledge Imam Nizar ibn Mustansir Billah's claim to the Imamate as maintained by Hassan-i Sabbah, and this point marks the fundamental split. Within two generations, the Fatimid Caliphate would suffer several more splits and eventually implode.

Hassan began converting local inhabitants and much of the military stationed at the fortress to the Isma'ili ideals of social justice and free thinking as he plotted to take over the fortress. During the final stages of his plan, he is believed to have lived within the fortress – possibly working as a chef – under the pseudonym "Dihkunda." He seized the fortress in 1090 AD from its then-ruler, a Zaidi Shia named Mahdi. This marks the founding of the Nizari Isma'ili state. Mahdi's life was spared, and he later received 3,000 gold Dinars in compensation.

Hassan-i Sabbah termed his doctrine al-Dawa al-Jadida ("The New Preaching") to contrast the Fatimid "Old Preaching". He was viewed as the Hujjah or "Proof" of the Imam, having direct secret contact with Imam Nizar and his rightful successors. Hassan-i Sabbah is also known as the first of the "Seven Lords of Alamut Castle", as he chose this secluded fortress as his base.

Under the leadership of Hassan-i Sabbah and the succeeding lords of Alamut, the strategy of covert capture was successfully replicated at strategic fortresses across Iran, Iraq, and the Fertile Crescent. Nizaris created a state of unconnected fortresses, surrounded by huge swathes of hostile territory, and managed a unified power structure that proved more effective than either that in Fatimid Cairo or Seljuq Bagdad, both of which suffered political instability, particularly during the transition between leaders. These periods of internal turmoil allowed the Isma'ili state respite from attack, and even to have such sovereignty as to have minted their own coinage.

The Fortress of Alamut was thought impregnable to any military attack, and was fabled for its heavenly gardens, impressive libraries, and laboratories where philosophers, scientists, and theologians could debate all matters in intellectual freedom.

==== Assassination ====
Owing to the difficult situation in which the Ismailis were placed, their system of self-defence took a peculiar form. When their fortresses were attacked or besieged, they were isolated like small islands in a stormy sea. They prepared their garrisons for the fight, but were unable to mount a sizable army so trained military commandos (fidā'iyyūn) as a rear-guard action. Fidā'iyyūn were covertly dispatched into the very heart of the Abbasid Court and enemy military strongholds as sleeper agents. In order to remove key figures planning or responsible for attacks against Isma'ili populations, fidā'iyyūn would take reprisal action for an attack or the planning of one by placing a dagger or a note within the chambers of their opponent as a warning or even assassinating a key opponent when they deemed it necessary. Known today as Assassins, these Isma'ilis were referred to as "Hashashin" by their enemies, as many of their political enemies believed them to consume the intoxicant hashish before being dispatched as agents although modern scholarship tends to dispute this theory as polemic fabricated to discredit the Isma'ili. Other theories suggest the term originates from them being followers of "Hassan". The term entered Western vocabulary through the returning Crusaders as "assassin".

==== The Seven Lords of Alamut Castle ====
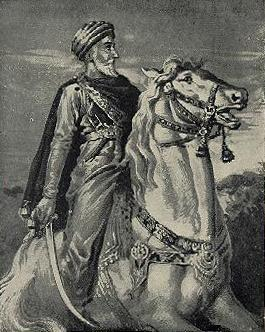
Artistic Rendering of Hassan-i Sabbah.

- Hassan-i Sabbah (1090–1124)
- Kiya Buzurg Ummid (1124–1138)
- Muhammad Buzurg Ummid (1138–1162)
- The first concealed imam of Alamut: Abū ʿAlī Ḥasan, or ʿAlī, surnamed Ali al-Hadi ibn Nizar
- The second concealed imam of Alamut: Muhammad El-Môhtadî bin el-Hâdî (in Turkish)
- The third concealed imam of Alamut: Hasan I El-Kahir bin el-Môhtadî bi-Kuvvet’ûl-Lâh / bi-Ahkâmî’l-Lâh (in Turkish)
- Ḥasan II ʿAlā Dhekrehee's Salām (1162–1166)
- Nūru-d-Dīn Muḥammad II (1166–1210)
- Jalālū-d-Dīn Ḥassan III (1210–1221)
- ‘Alā’a-d-Dīn Muḥammad III (1221–1255)
- Rukn al-Din Khurshah (1255–1256)

The fortress was destroyed on December 15, 1256, by Hulagu Khan as part of the Mongol offensive on Islamic Southwest Asia. The Nizari Ismailis made a critical mistake in the assassination of Genghis Khan's son, Chagatai, who ruled part of Iran. Chagatai had offended the Nizari Ismaili's by forbidding certain rituals involved in prayer and the slaughter of animals.

In 1256, the Mongols took their revenge. Most of the Nizari Ismailis were killed and their mountaintop fortresses destroyed. The Crusaders, already weakened by Mongol incursions and civil war, did not send assistance.

The last leader of the Nizari Ismaili state, Rukn al-Din Khurshah, surrendered it as part of a deal with Hulagu. However, the Mongols slaughtered the inhabitants, burnt the libraries, and brought down the fortifications. Isma'ili survivors made several attempts to recapture, and restore Alamut, and several other Isma'ili forts, but were defeated. In subsequent years, the punishment for anyone suspected of being Isma'ili would be instant death, it was common for political or social enemies to claim their rivals as secret Isma'ilis and call for their deaths.

=== The Wandering Mystics ===
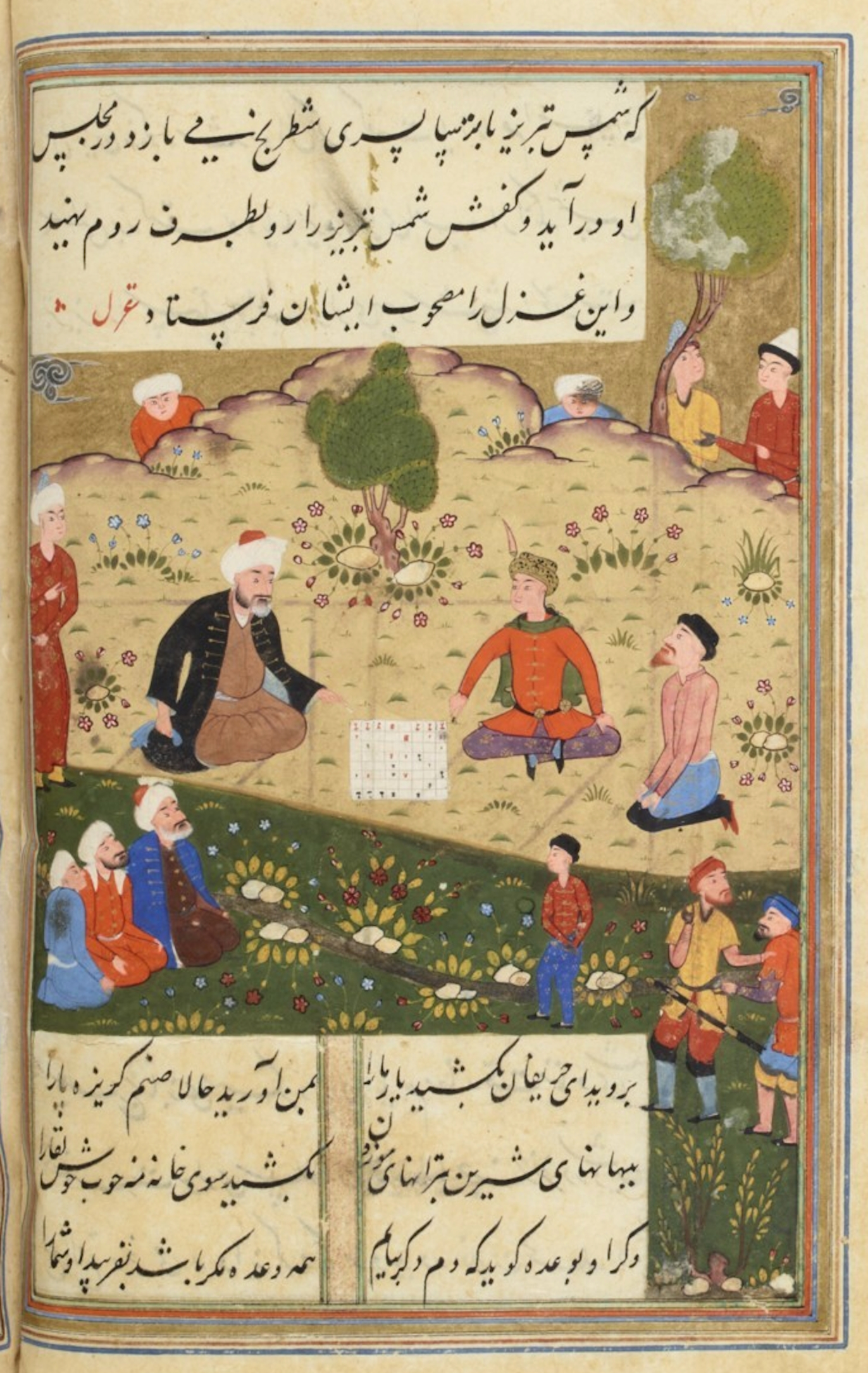
A page of a copy circa 1503 of the Diwan-e Shams-e Tabriz-i

The Isma'ili Imams, and their followers would wander Iran for several centuries in concealment, The Imams would often take on the garb of a tailor, or mystic master, and their followers as Sufi Muslims. During this period Iranian Sufism, and Isma'ilism would form a close bond. Shamsu-d-Dīn Muḥammad succeeded Ruknuddin Khwarshah as the 28th Imam, escaping as a child and living in concealment in Azerbaijan. The 29th Imam Qasim Shah, 30th Imam Islām Shāh and 31st Imam Muḥammad ibn Islām Shāh also lived in concealment. Here the Ismaili Imam became a Sufi master (murshid) and his followers mureeds which are terminologies that are used today. There is the offshoot of the Muhammad-Shahi Nizari Ismailis who follow the elder son of Shamsu-d-Dīn Muḥammad, the 28th Qasim-Shahi Imam, named ‘Alā’ ad-Dīn Mumin Shāh (26th Imam of the Muhammad-Shahi Nizari Ismailis). They follow this line of Imams until the disappearance of the 40th Imam Amir Muhammad al-Baqir in 1796. There are followers of this line of Nizari Imams in Syria today, locally called the Jafariyah.

=== Anjudān/Safavid Period ===
With Safavid Iran's establishment of Twelver Islam as its official religion, many Sufi orders declared themselves to be Shi’i. Approximately one hundred years before this however, the Ismaili imamate was being transferred to the village of Anjudan, near the Shi’i centres of Qumm and Kashan. This revival is commonly termed the "Anjudān period" and constituted a revival of Ismaili political stability, for the first time since the fall of Alamut. By the 15th century, a mini renaissance begins to develop in the village Anjudan near Mahallat. The Imams involved in the Anjudan Renaissance were 32nd Imam Mustanṣir billāh II, 33rd Abd al-Salam Shah and 34th Gharib Mirzā Abbas Shah. The Anjudan Renaissance ends by the 16th century with the Safavid dynasty gaining power in Iran and making Twelver Shia Islam the state religion. The Ismailis practiced taqiyyah/dissimulation as Twelver Shiites with the 36th Imam Murad Mirza being executed for political activity and the 45th Imam Shah Khalīlullāh III being murdered by a Twelver Shia mob in Yazd, Iran.

=== The Aga Khans ===
The period of the Aga Khans begins in 1817, when 45th Imam Shah Khalīl Allāh was murdered while giving refuge to his followers by a Twelver mob led by local religious leaders. His wife took her 13-year-old son and new Imam, Hassan Ali Shah to the then Qajar Emperor Shah in Tehran to seek justice. Although there was no serious penalty brought against those involved; Fath-Ali Shah Qajar gave his daughter, the princess Sarv-i Jahan, in marriage to the new Imam, and awarded him the title Agha Khan (Lord Chief). The 46th Ismāʿīlī Imām, Aga Hassan ‘Alī Shah, fled Iran in the 1840s after being blamed for a failed coup against the Shah of the Qajar dynasty. Aga Hassan ‘Alī Shah settled in Mumbai in 1848. The largest part of the Ismāʿīlī community, Qasim-Shahi Nizari today accepts Prince Rahim Aga Khan V as their 50th Imām, who they claim is descended from Muḥammad through his daughter Fāṭimah az-Zahra and 'Ali, Muḥammad's cousin and son-in-law.

== Contemporary Isma'ili ==
Almost all Nizaris today accept Rahim al-Husayni, known by his title "Aga Khan V", as their Imām-i Zāmān "Imam/Leader of the Time", except for about 15,000 Muhammad-Shahi Nizaris in western Syria. In Persian he is referred to Religiously as Khudawand (Lord of the Time), in Arabic as Mawlana (Master), or Hādhir Imām (Present Imam). Rahim succeeded his father Shah Karim Shah Aga Khan IV to the Imamate in 2025, aged just 53.

Prince Rahim al-Hussaini Aga Khan (Persian: رحیم الحسینی آغا خان; born 12 October 1971), known as His Highness the Aga Khan V (Persian: آقاخان پنجم), is a religious leader and businessman, best known as the 50th hereditary Imam of the Nizari Isma'ili Shi'i Muslims, as he succeeded the 1400-years old family's dynasty, linked by heredity to Muhammad through his daughter, Fatima, and the Prophet’s cousin and son-in-law, Ali, the first Imam. Today, the Ismailis are the only Shi'i community who, throughout history, have been led by a living and present hereditary Imam of direct descent from the Prophet.

In Africa, Asia and the Middle East, a major objective of the Community's social welfare and economic programs, until the mid-fifties, had been to create a broad base of businessmen, agriculturists, and professionals. The educational facilities of the community tended to emphasize secondary-level education. With the coming of independence, each nation's economic aspirations took on new dimensions, focusing on industrialization and modernization of agriculture. The community's educational priorities had to be reassessed in the context of new national goals, and new institutions had to be created to respond to the growing complexity of the development process.

In view of the importance that Islām places on maintaining a balance between the spiritual well-being of the individual and the quality of his life, the Imam's guidance deals with both aspects of the life of his followers. The Aga Khan has encouraged Isma'ili Muslims, settled in the industrialized world, to contribute towards the progress of communities in the developing world through various development programs. Indeed, the Economist noted: that Isma'ili immigrant communities, integrated seamlessly as an immigrant community, and did better at attaining graduate and post graduate degrees, "far surpassing their native, Hindu, Sikh, fellow Muslims, and Chinese communities".

=== Notable Isma'ili ===
In recent years, Isma'ili Muslims, who have come to the US, Canada and Europe, mostly as refugees from Asia and Africa, have readily settled into the social, educational and economic fabric of urban and rural centers across the two continents. As in the developing world, the Isma'ili Muslim community's settlement in the industrial world has involved the establishment of community institutions characterized by an ethos of self-reliance, an emphasis on education, and a pervasive spirit of philanthropy. Spiritual allegiance to the Imam and adherence to the Nizari tariqa according to the guidance of the Imam of the time, have engendered in the Isma'ili community an ethos of self-reliance, unity, and a common identity notwithstanding centuries of being marginalized and persecuted by native and established societies.

Notable Isma'ili include:

- Indian Internet pioneer Azim Premji, Forbes estimates his wealth at $14.5 Billion. He is famed for driving a Toyota Corolla, and flying economy, He has used his vast fortune to set up the philanthropic Azim Premji Foundation. Premji was ranked the wealthiest Indian until 2003, and remains India's wealthiest Muslim.
- Nasir al-Din Nasir Hunzai, Dr. Allamah Nasir al-Din Nasir Hunzai (born 1917 – died 2017) is a Pakistani writer and poet, known for his work on Islam and the Burushaski language. The president of the Islamic Republic of Pakistan conferred upon Prof. Dr. Nasir al-Din Hunzai the award of Sitarah-i-Imtiyaz on 23 March 2001 in recognition of his outstanding service in the fields of literature and scholarship. He was awarded an honorary PhD degree by Senior University in Canada where he has been associated for a long time as a visiting professor. His books have been translated into English, French, Swedish, Persian, Turkish, and Gujarati.
- Zul Vellani (1930 – Dec 31, 2010), Scriptwriter and commentator for over 700 Films Division of India's documentaries. Known as 'The Voice', he was the chosen narrator on All India Radio for Indira Gandhi's funeral procession. Also a film and theatre director, actor and playwright. His documentary film 'All Under Heaven By Force' won a National Award, while his film adaptation of Rabindranath Tagore's play 'Dak Ghar' won the Golden Plaque Award at the 2nd Tehran International Festival for Children and Young People. Wrote scripts for established film directors such as Mehboob and Shantaram as well as for K. Vasudev's ‘At Five Past Five’. Acted in many short as well as feature films, notable among them being Conrad Rook's ‘Siddhartha’. Author of 'The Burning Spear', a play on the Kenyan Mau-Mau independence movement commissioned by Mzee Jomo Kenyatta. Uncle, once removed, to Sir Ben Kingsley.
- Muhammad al-Maghut (1934– April 3, 2006) (Arabic: محمد الماغوط) was a famous Syrian writer and poet.
- Professor Azim Surani, CBE, Professor of Physiology and Reproduction at Cambridge University. The only British Muslim to be publicly honored for services to science.
- British journalist Yasmin Alibhai-Brown, ranked most influential British Muslim journalist by the Times.
- Mustapha Ghaleb (1923–1979) a distinguished Syrian historian.
- Yasmin Rattansi, Canada's first female Muslim MP.
- Saddaruddin Hashwani, business tycoon and 4th richest person of Pakistan.
- New York film producer Shahnee Zaver, an Indian female pioneer in film in the west.
- Karim Khoja, CEO of Roshan Telecom, Afghanistan's largest privately owned company providing almost 10% of government revenue. Until 2001 Isma'ili suffered systematic persecution under the War-Lords and the Taliban.
- Prince Saddrudin Aga Khan, the longest-ever serving head of United Nations High Commissioner for Refugees (UNHCR), twice nominated for UN Secretary General.
- Rahim Jaffer, first Muslim elected to Canada's Parliament.
- Mobina Jaffer, first Muslim appointed as a Canadian senator.
- Lalak Jan Shaahed, Pakistan awarded him the Nishan-i-Haider, Pakistan's highest military award, for extraordinary gallantry.
- Firoz Rasul, past president, CEO Ballard Power Systems in Vancouver. Current president of the Agakhan University.
- Sada Cumber, Entrepreneur and First Representative (Title of Special Envoy) to the OIC from the United States
- Ali Velshi, a Canadian television journalist best known for his work on CNN. He is CNN's Chief Business Correspondent, and co-host of CNN's weekly business show.
- Zain Verjee, State Department correspondent with CNN, based in Washington, D.C. Previously, she worked as a newsreader for The Situation Room and a co-anchor of CNN International's Your World Today.
- Meherban Karim(1979–2008) Pakistani Ismaili, a notable climber in international mountaineers Community. died on K-2 during descent.
- Shehzad Roy (Urdu: شہزاد رائے), a pop singer and humanitarian from Karachi, Pakistan.
- Saleem Jaffer, ex-Pakistani fast cricket bowler.
- Nazir Sabir, first Pakistani to climb world's highest peak Mount Everest.
- Ashraf Aman, first Pakistani to climb world's second highest peak K-2.
- Ismail Gulgee (October 25, 1926 – December 14, 2007), Pride of Performance, Sitara-e-Imtiaz (twice), Hilal-e Imtiaz, was an award-winning, globally famous Pakistani artist.
- Salim Merchant - Sulaiman Merchant Famous Bollywood musician

=== Silver Jubilee ===
From July 1982 to July 1983, to celebrate the present Aga Khan's Silver Jubilee, marking the 25th anniversary of his accession to the Imamate, many new social and economic development projects were launched. These range from the establishment of the US$300 million international Aga Khan University with its Faculty of Health Sciences and teaching hospital based in Karachi, the expansion of schools for girls and medical centers in the Hunza region, one of the remote parts of Northern Pakistan bordering on China and Afghanistan, to the establishment of the Aga Khan Rural Support Program in Gujarat, India, and the extension of existing urban hospitals and primary health care centers in Tanzania and Kenya. These initiatives form part of an international network of institutions involved in fields that range from education, health and rural development, to architecture and the promotion of private sector enterprise and together make up the Aga Khan Development Network.

It is this commitment to humanitarianism that inspires the Isma'ili Imamate's philanthropic institutions and which shapes the social conscience of the Isma'ili Muslim community.

=== Golden Jubilee ===
During his Golden Jubilee from 2007–2008 marking 50 years of Imamate the Aga Khan commissioned a number of projects, renowned Pritzker Prize winning Japanese architect Fumihiko Maki was commissioned to design a new kind of community structure resembling an embassy in Canada, The "Delegation of the Ismaili Imamat" opened on 8 December 2008, the building will be composed of two large interconnected spaces an atrium and a courtyard. The atrium is an interior space to be used all year round. It is protected by a unique glass dome made of multi-faceted, angular planes assembled to create the effect of rock crystal the Aga Khan asked Maki to consider the qualities of "rock crystal" in his design, which during the Fatimid Caliphate was valued by the Imams. Within the glass dome is an inner layer of woven glass-fibre fabric which will appear to float and hover over the atrium. The Delegation building sits along Sussex drive near the Canadian parliament. Future Delegation buildings are planned for other capitals, beginning with Lisbon, Portugal.

In addition to primary and secondary schools, the Aga Khan Academies were set up to equip future leaders in the developing world with a leading standard education. The Aga Khan Museum, which opened in Toronto, Ontario, Canada in 2011, is the first museum dedicated to Islamic civilization in the west. Its mission is the "acquisition, preservation and display of artefacts – from various periods and geographies – relating to the intellectual, cultural, artistic and religious heritage of Islamic communities". A series of new Isma'ili centre are underway, including Toronto, Ontario, Canada; Paris, France; Houston, Texas; Dushanbe and the Pamirs; Tajikistan.

=== Diamond jubilee ===
From 11 July 2017 to 11 July 2018 was designated as the diamond jubilee year of the Aga Khan IV's 60th year of reign. The Aga Khan travelled throughout the diamond jubilee year to countries where his humanitarian institutions operate to launch new programs that help alleviate poverty and increase access to education, housing and childhood development. The Aga Khan's diamond jubilee opening ceremony was held in Dubai. On March 8, 2018, Queen Elizabeth hosted the Aga Khan at Windsor Castle at a dinner to mark his diamond jubilee. During this important time he visited his murids around the world. He has already visited the United States, UAE, India, Pakistan, and Kenya during his diamond jubilee Mulaqat's. During his visit to Houston, he announced The Ismaili Centre Houston. The Aga Khan resided in Canada in early May 2018. His diamond jubilee came to an end at Lisbon, where a big festival was held. The festival included a Mulaqat for all the Nizari Ismaili Muslims around the world. Many performances and events were held around July 11, 2018, which was the Imamat day of the Aga Khan. Following a historic agreement with the Republic of Portugal in 2015, His Highness the Aga Khan officially designated the premises located at Rua Marquês de Fronteira in Lisbon – the Henrique de Mendonça Palace – as the seat of the Ismaili Imamat on July 11, 2018, and declared that it be known as the “Diwan of the Ismaili Imamat".

== The Isma'ili Imamate Timeline ==
#	Imam	Imamate period (CE)	Remarks
Isma'ili and Twelver Imams
1	'Alī ibn Abī Tālib	632–661	First Shia Isma'ili Imam and Fourth Rashidun Caliph of the Rashidun Caliphate
	Hasan	624–670	son of Ali (viewed as a temporary Imam by the Nizari), 5th Caliph of the Rashidun Caliphate
2	Husayn	661–680	son of Ali, martyred at Karbala, all Shia Imams must come from his male progeny, offshoot of the Kaysanites
3	'Alī Zayn al-Ābidīn	680–713	son of Husain, ascetic and pious, composes the Sahifa al-Sajjadiyya
4	Muḥammad al-Bāqir	713–743	son of Ali Zayn al-Ābidīn, ascetic and pious, defines fiqh, offshoot of the Zaidiyyah
5	Ja'far aṣ-Ṣādiq	743–765	son of Muhammad, defines Imamate in Shia doctrine, offshoot of the Fathites, Bazighiyya and Tawussite Shia
Isma'iliyah and Ithna' Ashariya split
6	Ismā'īl bin Jafar	765–775	Jafar's son and designated heir, accepted as Imam by the Ismailis, offshoot of the Sevener
7	Muhammad ibn Ismā'īl	775–813	Ismail's son, goes into hiding and dies in Salamiyah in Syria, offshoot of the Qaramita
First Period of Concealment or Dawr al Satr
8	ʿAbd Allāh Wafī Aḥmad	806–828	also known as ʿAbadullāh, based in Salamiyah
9	Aḥmad Taqī Muḥammad	828–870	son of ʿAbd Allāh, based in Salamiyah
10	Ḥusayn Radhī ad-dīn ʿAbd Allāh	870–881	son of Aḥmad, based in Salamiyah
Fatimid Caliphate
11	Abdullah al-Mahdi Billah	881–934	openly announced himself as Imam, first Fatimid Caliph, founded and based in Mahdia
12	Muḥammad al-Qā'im bi-'Amrillāh	934–946	second Fatimid Caliph, based in Mahdia
13	Abū Ṭāhir Ismā'il al-Manṣūr bi-llāh	946–953	third Fatimid Caliph, based in Raqqada
14	Maʿād al-Muʿizz li-Dīnillāh	953–975	fourth Fatimid Caliph, founded and based in Cairo
15	Abū Manṣūr Nizār al-ʿAzīz billāh	975–996	fifth Fatimid Caliph, based in Cairo
16	Al-Ḥakīm bi-Amri 'l-llāh	996–1021	sixth Fatimid Caliph, based in Cairo, disappeared 1021. The Druze believe in the divinity of Al-Hakim's disappearance, believed by them to be the occultation of the Mahdi.
17	ʿAlī az-Zāhir li-Iʿzāz Dīnillāh	1021–1036	son of al-Hakim, seventh Fatimid Caliph, based in Cairo
18	Abū Tamīm Ma'add al-Mustanṣir bi-llāh	1036–1094	eighth Fatimid Caliph, based in Cairo
Nizari Ismaili Imām in captivity
19	Nizar (Fatimid Imam)	1094–1095	son of al-Mustansir, based in Cairo and Alexandria, rebels against Al-Musta'li but fails and died in prison, offshoot of the Musta'li sect
Concealed Imāms of Alamūt: Second Period of Concealment or Dawr al Satr
20	Husayn Ali al-Hādī	1095–1132	escapes to Alamut Castle in Alamut with a Nizari Da'i Abul Hasan Saidi from Egypt
21	Muḥammad I al-Muhtadī	1132–1162	based in Alamut Castle
22	Ḥassan I al-Qāhir bi-Quwwatu'llāh	1162–1164	based in Alamut Castle
Sultans of Alamut based at Alamut Castle, governing the Nizari Ismaili State
23	Ḥassan II	1164–1166	Son of Imam al-Qahir and the first Nizari Ismaili Imam of Alamut to openly declare himself as such, murdered, based in Alamut Castle
24	Nūr ad-Dīn Muḥammad II	1166–1210	Son of Hassan II, openly declared himself the Imam, murdered, based in Alamut Castle
25	Jalāl ad-Dīn Ḥassan III	1210–1221	Son of Nur ad-Din Muhammad II, adopts the Sunni Shafi‘i madhhab as Taqiyya, based in Alamut Castle
26	‘Alā’ ad-Dīn Muḥammad III	1221–1255	Son of Jalal ad-Din Hasan, based in Alamut Castle
27	Rukn al-Din Khurshah	1255–1257	Son of Muhammad III and last Lord of Alamut; surrendered to Hulagu Khan in 1256; travelled to the court of Kublai Khan but was murdered on the journey back in 1257, based in Alamut Castle.
Third Period of Concealment
28	Shamsu-d-Dīn Muḥammad	1257–1310	adopts Sufism as Taqiyya, based in Tabriz, Azerbaijan
29	Qasim Shah	1310–1368	adopts Sufism as Taqiyya, based in Tabriz, Azerbaijan, Offshoot of the Muhammad-Shahi or Mumini Nizari sect
30	Islām Shāh	1368–1424	adopts Sufism as Taqiyya, based in Kahak
31	Muḥammad ibn Islām Shāh	1424–1464	adopts Sufism as Taqiyya, based in Kahak
Anjudan Renaissance – The Nizari Ismaili Imams are based in the village of Anjudan near Qom and Kashan in Iran
32	‘Ali Shah Qalandar Mustansir bi’llah II	1464–1480	adopts Sufism as Taqiyya, based in Anjudan
33	Abd-us-Salam Shah	1480–1494	adopts Sufism as Taqiyya, based in Anjudan
34	Gharib Mirzā Abbas Shah	1494–1498	adopts Sufism as Taqiyya, based in Anjudan
Anjudan Renaissance ends, The Twelver Shia rule of the Safavids, Fourth Period of Concealment
35	Abū Dharr ʿAlī Nūru-d-Dīn (Nur Shah)	1498–1509	adopts Twelver Shia as Taqiyya, based in Anjudan
36	Murād Mīrzā	1509–1574	adopts Twelver Shia as Taqiyya, based in Anjudan, offshoot of Satpanth
37	Dhu al-Fiqār ʿAlī Khalīlullāh I	1574–1634	adopts Twelver Shia as Taqiyya, based in Anjudan
38	Nūr ad-Dahr (Nūr ad-Dīn) ʿAlī	1634–1671	adopts Twelver Shia as Taqiyya, based in Anjudan
39	Khalīl Allāh II ʿAlī	1671–1680	adopts Twelver Shia as Taqiyya, based in Anjudan
40	Shāh Nizār II	1680–1722	adopts Twelver Shia as Taqiyya, based in Kahak
41	Sayyid ʿAlī	1722–1736	adopts Twelver Shia as Taqiyya, based in Kahak
42	Sayyid Hasan ‘Ali Beg	1736–1747	adopts Twelver Shia as Taqiyya, based in Kahak
43	Qāsim ʿAlī (Sayyid Jaʿfar)	1747–1756	adopts Twelver Shia as Taqiyya, based in Kahak
44	Sayyid Abu’l-Hasan ‘Ali (Bāqir Shāh)	1756–1792	adopts Twelver Shia as Taqiyya, based in Kahak
45	Shāh Khalīlullāh III	1792–1817	adopts Twelver Shia as Taqiyya, later murdered by a Twelver Shia mob in Yazd, Iran
The Aga Khans starting from 1817
46	Aga Khan I	1817–1881	Born in Kahak, the first Nizari Ismaili Imam given the title of Aga Khan by Fath-Ali Shah Qajar. Rebels against Mohammad Shah Qajar but is defeated and joins the British in Herat, Afghanistan to defend them from bandits and they, in turn, help him return to Persia. Dies in Mumbai, India and buried in Hasanabad.
47	Aga Khan II	1881–1885	son of Aga Khan I, born in Mahallat, based in Mumbai and buried in Najaf.
48	Aga Khan III	1885–1957	son of Aga Khan II, born in Karachi, died in Versoix near Geneva, Switzerland buried in the Mausoleum of Aga Khan, Aswan, Egypt.
49	Shāh Karīm-al-Ḥussaynī, His Highness Prince Karīm Āgā Khān IV	1957–2025	grandson of Aga Khan III, born in Geneva, Switzerland based at the Aiglemont estate in Gouvieux in the Picardie region of France and in Lisbon, Portugal, died in Lisbon and buried in the Mausoleum of Aga Khan, Aswan, Egypt.
50	Shāh Rahīm Aga Khan V	2025-present	son of Aga Khan IV, born in Geneva, Switzerland and based in Lisbon, Portugal.
