= Aga Khan V =

50th Imam of the Nizari Isma'ili community

His Highness Aga Khan V
- آقاخان پنجم
- Rahim al-Hussaini in New Delhi in September 2026
- Citizenship: France; Portugal; Switzerland; United Kingdom

50th Hereditary Imam of the Nizari Isma'ilism Muslim
- Tenure: 4 February 2025 – present
- Installation: 11 February 2025
- Predecessor: Aga Khan IV
- Born: Shah Rahim al-Hussaini; 12 October 1971 (age 55); Geneva, Switzerland
- Spouse: Kendra Irene Spears (m. 2013; div. 2022)
- Issue: Irfan Aga Khan; Sinan Aga Khan
- House: Fatimid
- Father: Aga Khan IV
- Mother: Salimah Aga Khan
- Religion: Nizari Isma'ilism Shia Islam
- Occupation: Spiritual leader; Philanthropist

Shah Rahim al-Hussaini (Note: Arabic: شاه رحيم الحسيني, romanized: Shāh Rahīm al-Ḥusaynī) (born 12 October 1971), known simply as Aga Khan V, (Note: Persian: آقاخان پنجم, romanized: Āqā Khān Panjum) is the 50th Imam of the Nizari Isma'ilis since 2025. He is a philanthropist, socialite, and businessman, who inherited the Nizari imamate and the title of Aga Khan upon the death of his father, Shah Karim al-Hussaini (Aga Khan IV).

He is the second of four children of Shah Karim al-Husseini, who went by the title Aga Khan IV, and succeeded as the Nizari Imam following his father's death on 4 February 2025. He is the fifth person in the family to hold the title Aga Khan. Upon assuming the Imamate, he inherited his father's estate, which was valued at over US$13.3 billion by Vanity Fair in 2013.

== Early life and education ==
Rahim Aga Khan was born on 12 October 1971, in Geneva, Switzerland. He is the eldest son and second oldest of three children born to Prince Karim al-Husseini (Aga Khan IV) and his first wife Salimah Aga Khan (née Sarah Croker-Poole), a British national.

Rahim was educated in the United States, receiving his secondary education at Phillips Academy Andover, Massachusetts from which he graduated in 1990, before graduating from Brown University with a bachelor's degree in comparative literature in 1995. In 2006 he completed graduate studies in management and administration in Barcelona, Spain, at the IESE Business School University of Navarra.

Based in Geneva, Switzerland, Rahim has been involved for many years in the governance of the Aga Khan Development Network (AKDN), where he chaired the AKDN Environment and Climate Committee.

In 2019, Rahim sat on either the Board or Executive Committee for several of AKDN agencies and affiliated structures, including the Aga Khan Fund for Economic Development, and the Aga Khan University Foundation.

In 2010, he established the Aga Khan Brown Workshop series at the Watson Institute.

== Succession to the Imamate ==
Prince Rahim al-Hussaini, who had been designated successor by his father, was publicly announced as the 50th Imam following his father's death on 4 February 2025. The announcement took place after the reading of Prince Karim al-Husseini’s will at the Ismaili Centre in Lisbon. According to Nizari Ismaili tradition, leadership passes through designation by the previous Imam.

== Personal life ==
Rahim married Kendra Irene Spears on 31 August 2013 in Geneva. They have two children: Prince Irfan (b. 11 April 2015) and Prince Sinan (b. 2 January 2017). In 2019, he bought a house in Unstad in Vestvågøy Municipality, Norway. The couple divorced in February 2022.

The style of His Highness was granted to Prince Rahim by King Charles III on 10 February 2025.

== Patrilineal descent ==
Patrilineal descent

Shah Rahim al-Hussaini Aga Khan's patriline is the line from which he is descended father to son.

Nizari Imams of the Fatimid Dynasty

1. Adnan
2. Ma'ad ibn Adnan
3. Nizar ibn Ma'ad
4. Mudar ibn Nizar
5. Ilyas ibn Mudar
6. Mudrikah ibn Ilyas
7. Khuzayma ibn Mudrika
8. Kinanah ibn Khuzayma
9. An-Nadr ibn Kinanah
10. Malik ibn Al-Nadr
11. Fihr ibn Malik
12. Ghalib ibn Fihr
13. Lu'ayy ibn Ghalib
14. Ka'b ibn Lu'ayy
15. Murrah ibn Ka'b
16. Kilab ibn Murrah b. ca. 372
17. Qusay ibn Kilab ca. 400–ca. 480
18. Abd Manaf ibn Qusai
19. Hashim ibn Abd Manaf, ca. 464–ca. 497
20. Abd al-Muttalib, ca. 497–578
21. Abu Talib ibn Abd al-Muttalib, 535–619
22. 4th Caliph and 1st Imam Ali ibn Abu Talib, 601–661, cousin and son-in-law of the Prophet Muhammad
23. 2nd Imam Husayn ibn Ali, 626–680
24. 3rd Imam Ali ibn Husayn Zayn al-Abidin, 659–713
25. 4th Imam Muhammad al-Baqir, 677–733
26. 5th Imam Jafar al-Sadiq, ca. 702–765
27. 6th Imam Ismail ibn Jafar, ca. 722–ca. 762
28. 7th Imam Muhammad ibn Ismail, 740–813
29. 8th Imam Ahmad al-Wafi, 795/796–827/828
30. 9th Imam Muhammad at-Taqi (Isma'ili), 813/814–839/840
31. 10th Imam Radi Abdullah, 832–881
32. 11th Imam Caliph Abdullah al-Mahdi Billah, 873–934
33. 12th Imam Caliph Al-Qa'im, 893–946
34. 13th Imam Caliph Al-Mansur Billah, 914–953
35. 14th Imam Caliph Al-Mu'izz li-Din Allah, 932–975
36. 15th Imam Caliph Al-Aziz Billah, 955–996
37. 16th Imam Caliph Al-Hakim bi-Amr Allah, 985–1021
38. 17th Imam Caliph Ali az-Zahir, 1005–1036
39. 18th Imam Caliph Al-Mustansir Billah, 1029–1094
40. 19th Imam Nizar al-Mustafa, 1045–1095
41. 20th Imam Ali Al-Husayn Al-Hadi, 1076–1132
42. 21st Imam Al-Muhtadi, Muhammad I, 1106–1157
43. 22nd Imam Al-Qahir, Hasan I, 1126–1162
44. 23rd Imam Hassan II of Alamut (also referred to as ʿAlā Dhikrihi's-Salām), 1142/1145–1166
45. 24th Imam Muhammad II of Alamut, 1148–1210
46. 25th Imam Hassan III of Alamut, 1187–1221
47. 26th Imam Muhammad III of Alamut, 1211–1255
48. 27th Imam Rukn al-Din Khurshah, ca. 1230–1256/1257
49. 28th Imam Shams al-Din (Nizari), 1257–1310
50. 29th Imam Qasim Shah, 1310–1368
51. 30th Imam Islam Shah, d. 1424
52. 31st Imam Muhammad ibn Islam Shah, d. 1464
53. 32nd Imam Ali Shah Qalandar, al-Mustansir Billah II, d. 1480
54. 33rd Imam Abd-us-Salam Shah, d. 1494
55. 34th Imam Abbas Shah Gharib, al-Mustansir Billah III, d. 1498
56. 35th Imam Abuzar Ali Nur Shah, d. ca. 1509
57. 36th Imam Murād Mīrzā, d. 1574
58. 37th Imam Dhu'l-Fiqar Ali Zulfiqar Ali, Khalilullah I, d. 1634
59. 38th Imam Nur al-Din Ali, d. 1671
60. 39th Imam Ali, Khalilullah II, d. 1680
61. 40th Imam Shah Nizar II, d. 1722
62. 41st Imam Sayed Ali, d. ca. 1736
63. 42nd Imam Al-Hassan Ali Beg, d. ca. 1747
64. 43rd Imam Sayed Jafar, Al-Qasim Ali, d. ca. 1756
65. 44th Imam Abū-l-Hasan ʻAlī, d. 1792
66. 45th Imam Shah Khalilullah III, 1740–1817
67. 46th Imam Hasan Ali Shah, Aga Khan I, 1804–1881
68. 47th Imam Aqa Ali Shah, Aga Khan II, 1830–1885
69. 48th Imam Sultan Muhammad Shah, Aga Khan III, 1877–1957
70. Aly Khan, 1911–1960
71. 49th Imam Shah Karim al-Hussaini, Aga Khan IV, 1936–2025
72. 50th Imam Shah Rahim al-Hussaini, Aga Khan V, 1971–

== Titles, Styles and Honours ==
=== Honours ===
- Pakistan:
  - Nishan-e-Pakistan (NPk, 7 June 2024)
- Kenya:
  - Chief of the Order of the Golden Heart of Kenya (CGH, 26 August 2025)
- Uganda:
  - Grand Master of the Most Excellent Order of the Pearl of Africa (11 September 2025)

=== Awards ===
- Egypt:
  - Symbolic Key to the City of Aswan by the Governor of Aswan (9 February 2025)
- United States:
  - Symbolic Key to the City of Sugar Land, Texas by the Mayor of Sugar Land (5 November 2025)
  - Symbolic Key to the City of Houston by the Mayor of Houston (5 November 2025)
  - Symbolic Key to the City of Dallas by the Mayor of Dallas (9 November 2025)
  - Symbolic Key to the City of Carrollton by the Mayor of Carrollton (9 November 2025)
  - Symbolic Key to the City of Euless by the Mayor of Euless (9 November 2025)
- Canada:
  - Symbolic Key to the City of Toronto by the Mayor of Toronto (30 March 2026)
  - Civic Merit Award by the Mayor of Vancouver (26 July 2026)
- Italy:
  - Honorary Citizenship of Arzachena, Sardinia, Italy by the Mayor of Arzachena (9 July 2026)
