= List of Isma'ili imams =

This is a list of the Imams as recognised by the different sub-sects of the Ismai'li sect of Shia Islam. Imams are considered members of the Bayt (Household) of Muhammad through his daughter Fatima.

== Early Imams ==
All Isma'ili sects roughly share the first four Imams with the Zaydi Shia, and the first six Imams with the Twelver Shia. The Nizari and Musta'li are collectively also known as Fatimid Isma'ili, in contrast to the Sevener Isma'ili.

After Ali ibn Husayn Zayn al-Abidin, the Zaydis consider Zayd ibn Ali to be their next Imam rather than his older brother Muhammad al-Baqir who is considered the next Imam by the Isma'ili and Twelvers. After Ja'far al-Sadiq, the Twelvers consider Musa ibn Ja'far to be their next Imam, whereas Fatimid Isma'ilis consider his older brother Isma'il ibn Ja'far to be their next Imam, followed next by his son Muhammad ibn Isma'il. The Sevener Isma'ilis consider either Isma'il ibn Ja'far or his son Muhammad ibn Isma'il to be their final Imam and occulted Mahdi.

Sevener		Fatimid			
Waqifi	Qarmatian	Musta'li	Nizari	Personage	Period
1	1	Asās	1	Ali	(632–661)
2	2	1	Mustawda	Hasan ibn Ali	(661–669) Mustaali
3	3	2	2	Husayn ibn Ali	(669–680) (Mustaali) (661–680) (Nizari)
4	4	3	3	Ali ibn Husayn Zayn al-Abidin	(680–713)
5	5	4	4	Muhammad al-Baqir	(713–733)
6	6	5	5	Ja'far al-Sadiq	(733–765)
7 (Mahdi)	—	6	6	Isma'il ibn Ja'far	(765–775)
—	7 (Mahdi)	7	7	Muhammad ibn Isma'il	(775–813)

The Seveners propagated their faith from their bases in Syria through Da'iyyun. In 899, Abd Allah al-Mahdi Billah announced that he was the "Imam of the Time" being also the fourth direct descendant of Muhammad ibn Isma'il in the very same dynasty, and proclaimed his previous three descendant Da'is to have been "hidden Imams". This caused a split between his Sevener followers accepting his claim and the Qarmatian who continued to dispute his claim and considered Muhammad ibn Isma'il as the Imam in occultation. Abdallah al-Mahdi Billah eventually became the first Fatimid Caliph with his empire spanning Egypt and the eastern Maghreb. Sevener communities continued to exist in Eastern Arabia and Syria, and for a while in northern Iran but where it was gradually replaced by Fatimid Isma'ilis and other Shiʿi communities.

== Fatimid ==
In the Fatimid and its successor Isma'ili traditions, the Imamate was held by the following. Each Imam listed is considered the son of the preceding Imam by mainstream accounts.

8. Abd Allah ibn Muhammad (Ahmad al-Wafi), died 829, "hidden Imam", son of Muhammad ibn Isma'il according to Fatimid Isma'ili tradition
9. Ahmad ibn Abd Allah (Muhammad at-Taqi), died 840, "hidden Imam"
10. Husayn ibn Ahmad (Abd Allah al-Radi), died 881, "hidden Imam"
11. Abd Allah al-Mahdi Billah, died 934, openly declares himself Imam, 1st Fatimid Caliph
12. Al-Qa'im bi-Amr Allah, died 946, 2nd Fatimid Caliph
13. Al-Mansur bi-Nasr Allah, died 953, 3rd Fatimid Caliph
14. Al-Mu'izz li-Din Allah, died 975, 4th Fatimid Caliph
15. Abu Mansur Nizar al-Aziz Billah, died 996, 5th Fatimid Caliph
16. Al-Hakim bi-Amr Allah, 6th Fatimid Caliph, disappeared 1021. The Druze believe in the divinity of all Imams and split off after al-Hakim's disappearance, believed by them to be the occultation of the Mahdi.
17. Al-Zahir li-I'zaz Din Allah, died 1036, 7th Fatimid Caliph
18. Al-Mustansir Billah, died 1094, 8th Fatimid Caliph.

After his death, the succession was disputed. The regent Malik al-Afdal placed Mustansir's younger son Al-Musta'li Billah on the throne. This was contested by the elder son Nizar al-Mustafa li-Din Allah, who was defeated and died in prison. This dispute resulted in the split into two branches, lasting to this day, the Nizari and the Musta'li.

== Musta'li ==
The rival lines of succession of the Isma'ili imams resulting from the Musta'li–Nizari and Hafizi–Tayyibi schisms

The Musta'li recognised Imams:

19. Ahmad al-Musta'li Billah, died 1101, 9th Fatimid Caliph, son of al-Mustansir Billah
20. Al-Amir bi-Ahkam Allah, died 1130, 10th Fatimid Caliph, son of al-Musta'li Billah

Hafizi Ismaili Muslims claimed that al-Amir died without an heir and was succeeded as Caliph and Imam by his cousin al-Hafiz. The Musta'li split into the Hafizi, who accepted him and his successors as an Imam, and the Tayyibi, who believed that al-Amir's purported son at-Tayyib was the rightful Imam and had gone into occultation.

=== Tayyibi ===
The Tayyibi recognised Imam:

21. Abu'l-Qasim al-Tayyib, born 1130, disappeared in 1132, son of al-Amir bi-Ahkam Allah

The Tayyibi branch continues to this day, headed by a Da'i al-Mutlaq as vice-regent in the imam's occultation. The Tayibbi have broken into several branches over disputes as to which Da'i is the true vice-regent. The largest branch are the Dawoodi Bohra, and there are also the Sulaymani Bohra and Alavi Bohra.

=== Hafizi ===
The Hafizi recognised Imams:

21. Al-Hafiz li-Din Allah, died 1149, 11th Fatimid Caliph, cousin of al-Amir bi-Ahkam Allah
22. Al-Zafir bi-Amr Allah, died 1154, 12th Fatimid Caliph, son of al-Hafiz li-Din Allah
23. Al-Fa'iz bi-Nasr Allah, died 1160, 13th Fatimid Caliph, son of al-Zafir bi-Amr Allah
24. Al-Adid li-Din Allah, died 1171, son of Yusuf ibn al-Hafiz li-Din Allah, 14th Fatimid Caliph. The Fatimid Caliphate ended with Al-Adid's death.
25. Da'ud al-Hamid li-Allah, died 1207/8, son of al-Adid li-Din Allah. Died in prison under the Ayyubid dynasty, Al-Adil I.
26. Sulayman Badr al-Din, died 1248, son of Da'ud al-Hamid li-Allah. Died in prison under the Ayyubid dynasty, As-Salih Ayyub. The last Hafizi Imam.

The Hafizi Ismaili sect lived on until the 14th century in Egypt and Syria but had died out by the end of the 14th century.

== Nizari ==
#	Imams	Period
19	Nizar al-Mustafa li-Din Allah ibn al-Mustansir Billah	1094–1097
20	Ali al-Hadi ibn Nizar al-Mustafa li-Din Allah ("hidden")	1097–1136
21	Muhammad al-Muhtadi ibn Ali al-Hadi ("hidden")	1136–1158
22	Hasan al-Qahir ibn Muhammad al-Muhtadi ("hidden")	1158–1162
23	Hasan Ala Zikrihis-Salam ibn Hasan al-Qahir	1162–1166
24	Nur al-Din Muhammad ibn Hasan Ala Zikrihis-Salam	1166–1210
25	Jalal al-Din Hasan ibn Nur al-Din Muhammad	1210–1221
26	Ala al-Din Muhammad ibn Jalal al-Din Hasan	1221–1255
27	Rukn al-Din Hasan Khurshah ibn Ala al-Din Muhammad	1255–1256
28	Shams al-Din Muhammad ibn Rukn al-Din Hasan Khurshah	1257–1310

Following the death of Shams al-Din Muhammad, the Nizari Isma'ili split into two groups: the Mu'mini Nizari (Muhammad-Shahi Nizari) who considered his elder son Ala al-Din Mu'min Shah to be the next Imam followed by his son Muhammad Shah, and the Qasimi Nizari (Qasim-Shahi Nizari) who consider his younger son Qasim Shah to be the next Imam.

=== Mu'mini ===
26. Ala al-Din Mu'min Shah ibn Shams al-Din Muhammad, died 1377; the elder son of Shams al-Din Muhammad.
27. Muhammad Shah ibn Mu'min Shah, died 1404.
28. Radi al-Din ibn Muhammad Shah, died 15th century.
29. Afif Jawad, died 15th century.
30. Radi al-Din II ibn Tahir, died 1509.
31. Shah Tahir ibn Radi al-Din II al-Husayni ad-Dakkani, died 1549. The most famous Imam from this line.
32. Haydar ibn Shah Tahir, died 1586.
33. Sadr al-Din Muhammad ibn Haydar, died 1622.
34. Mu'in al-Din ibn Sadr al-Din, died 1644.
35. Atiyyat Allah ibn Mu'in al-Din (Khudaybaksh), died 1663.
36. Aziz Shah ibn Atiyyat Allah, died 1691.
37. Mu'in al-Din II ibn Aziz Shah, died 1715.
38. Amir Muhammad al-Musharraf ibn Mu'in al-Din II, died 1764.
39. Haydar al-Mutahhar ibn Muhammad al-Musharraf, died 1786
40. Amir Muhammad al-Baqir ibn Haydar al-Mutahhar, the final known Imam of this line, disappeared in 1796.

Following the disappearance of Amir Muhammad al-Baqir, some of the Mu'mini Ismaili believed he had gone into occultation. The Mu'mini Ismaili sect died out by the start of the 20th century.

=== Qasimi ===
29. Qasim Shah, younger son of Shams al-Din Muhammad, 1310–1368.
30. Islam Shah established himself in Anjudan, 1368–1424.
31. Muhammad ibn Islam Shah, 1424–1464.
32. Ali Shah al-Mustansir Billah II (Shah Qalandar), established public Imamate under the practice of Sufi taqiyya in Anjudan, 1464–1480.
33. Abd al-Salam Shah, in Anjudan, 1480–1494.
34. Gharib Mirza (al-Mustansir Billah III), in Anjudan, 1494–1498.
35. Abu Dharr Ali, in Anjudan, 1498–1509.
36. Murad Mirza, 1509–1574, executed in 1574 by Shah Tahmasp I of Iran.
37. Khalil Allah I (Dhu'l-Faqar Ali), in Anjudan, 1574–1634.
38. Nur al-Dahr Ali, in Anjudan, 1634–1671.
39. Khalil Allah II Ali, last Imam of Anjudan, 1671–1680.
40. Shah Nizar II, established imamate in Kahak, 1680–1722.
41. Sayyid Ali, in Kahak, 1722–1736.
42. Sayyid Hasan Ali, established imamate in Shahr-e Babak, Kerman, 1736–1747, first Imam who abandoned the practice of taqiyya.
43. Qasim Ali (Sayyid Ja'far), in Kerman, 1747–1756.
44. Abu'l-Hasan Ali (Baqir Shah), 1756–1792.
45. Shah Khalil Allah III, in Kahak, then since 1815 in Yazd, 1792–1817, murdered in 1817.
46. Hasan Ali Shah Aga Khan I or Shah Hasan Ali (lived 1804–1881; reigned 1817–1881).
47. Aqa Ali Shah Aga Khan II or Shah Ali Shah (lived 1830–1885; reigned 1881–1885).
48. Sultan Muhammad Shah Aga Khan III (lived 1877–1957; reigned 1885–1957).
49. Shah Karim al-Husayni Aga Khan IV (lived 1936–2025; reigned 1957–2025).
50. Shah Rahim al-Hussaini Aga Khan V (1971–; reign 2025–present).

The Qasimi Nizari Ismaili Imams have used the Aga Khan title since 1817.

== See also ==
- Mahdi
