= Aga Khan IV =

Imam of Nizari Isma'ilism from 1957 to 2025

His Highness Aga Khan IV KBE CC GCC GCIH GCL GCM
- Karim al-Husseini in 1985

49th Hereditary Imam of the Nizari Isma'ilism Muslim
- In office 11 July 1957 – 4 February 2025
- Preceded by: Aga Khan III
- Succeeded by: Aga Khan V

Personal life
- Born: Shah Karim al-Hussaini; 13 December 1936 Geneva, Switzerland
- Died: 4 February 2025 (aged 88) Lisbon, Portugal
- Resting place: Mausoleum of Aga Khan, Aswan, Egypt
- Spouse: Sarah Croker Poole (m. 1969; div. 1995) Gabriele Homey (m. 1998; div. 2011)
- Children: Zahra Aga Khan; Rahim Aga Khan (successor); Hussain Aga Khan; Aly Muhammad Aga Khan
- Parents: Aly Aga Khan (father); Joan Yarde-Buller (mother)
- Citizenship: United Kingdom; France; Switzerland; Portugal; Canada (honorary)
- Other name: Karim al-Hussaini

Religious life
- Religion: Shia Islam
- Denomination: Isma'ilism
- School: Nizari Ismaili
- Lineage: Fatimid

Prince Shah Karim al-Hussaini (Note: In English-language media and official communications, he is commonly referred to as His Highness "Prince Karim al-Hussaini Aga Khan IV". The form of "Mawlana Shah Karim al-Hussaini Aga Khan IV" is instead used in biographical and religious contexts to reflect his hereditary title (Shah), lineage (al-Hussaini, denoting descent from Imam Hussain), and dynastic role as the 49th Imam of the Nizari Ismaili Muslims.) (Note: Arabic: شاه كريم الحسيني, romanized: Shāh Karīm al-Ḥusaynī) (13 December 1936 – 4 February 2025), known simply as Aga Khan IV, (Note: Persian: آقاخان چهارم, romanized: Āqā Khān Chahārom) was the 49th Imam of Nizari Isma'ili Shia Islam from 1957 until his death in 2025. He inherited the Nizari imamate and the title of Aga Khan at the age of 20 upon the death of his grandfather, Sultan Muhammad Shah (Aga Khan III). During his Imamate, he was also known by the religious title Mawlānā Hazar Imam by his Isma'ili followers.

Al-Husseini's net worth was estimated at over US$13.3 billion by Vanity Fair in 2013. Forbes included al-Husseini in its list of the world's fifteen richest royals, though he held no political sovereignty or territorial authority. The designation referred to his hereditary role as Imam of the Nizari Ismailis, not to any formal royal or monarchical status. He was the founder and chairman of the Aga Khan Development Network, a private development network.

== Early life and education ==
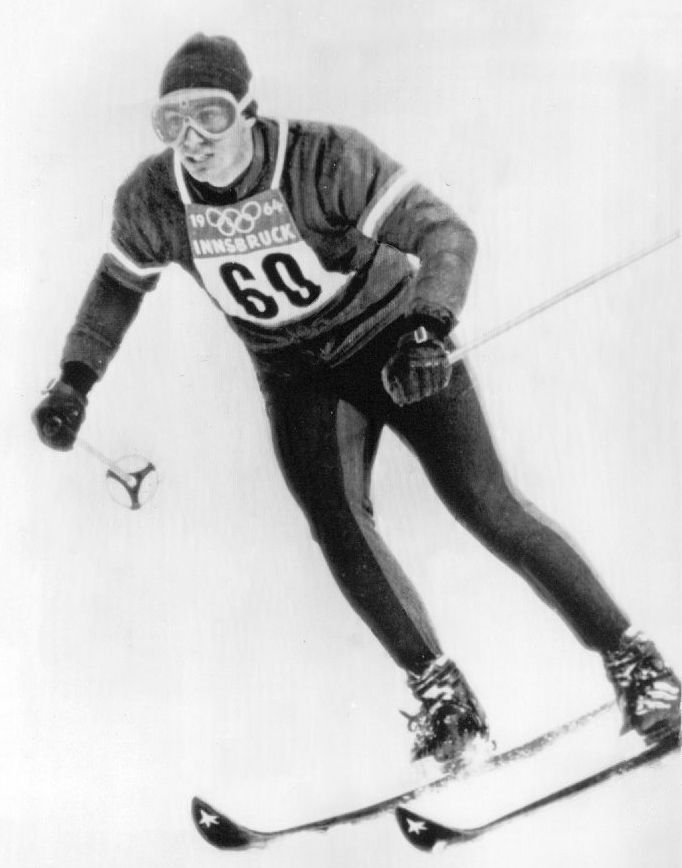
Al-Husseini skiing for Iran at the 1964 Winter Olympics

Karim al-Husseini was born in Geneva, Switzerland, on 13 December 1936, the eldest son of Aly Khan (1911–1960) and his first wife, Taj-ud-dawlah Aga Khan (formerly Joan Yarde-Buller, 1908–1997). His mother was the eldest daughter of the British peer John Yarde-Buller, 3rd Baron Churston.

He was declared healthy despite being born prematurely. His brother, Amyn Aga Khan, was born a year later in 1937. In 1949, his parents divorced in part due to his father's extramarital affairs, and shortly after, his father married American actress Rita Hayworth—with whom he had a daughter, Yasmin Aga Khan, the half-sister of al-Husseini.

He also had a half-brother, Patrick Benjamin Guinness (1931–1965), from his mother's first marriage, as Joan Yarde-Buller was previously married to Loel Guinness of the banking Guinnesses.

Karim spent the years during World War II in Nairobi, Kenya, where his early education was through private tutoring. He later attended the Institut Le Rosey in Switzerland for nine years where he achieved, in his words, "fair grades". He was admitted to the Massachusetts Institute of Technology where he wanted to study science, but his grandfather, Aga Khan III, vetoed the decision. Instead he attended Harvard University, where he was elected a member of The Delphic Club and majored in Islamic history.

When his grandfather died, he was thrust into the position of the Aga Khan. At the time of his accession to the Imamate in 1957, Karim was a university student. Reflecting on the transition, he later stated that he had to set aside plans for further academic study in order to assume his new responsibilities as Imam. He graduated from Harvard University in 1959, two years after ascending the Imamate, with a Bachelor of Arts degree in history (with Cum Laude honours) and his varsity H for the Harvard Crimson men's soccer team.

He was a competitive downhill skier, representing Great Britain at the FIS Alpine World Ski Championships 1962 and then Iran in the 1964 Winter Olympics.

== Succession and appointment as Imam ==
After the death of Aga Khan III in 1957, Shah Karim al-Husseini was appointed as the 49th Imam of the Nizari Ismaili community at the age of 20. His designation was made through the will of his grandfather, bypassing his father, Aly Khan, and his uncle, Sadruddin Aga Khan. This was the second recorded instance in Nizari Ismaili history where a grandson, rather than a son, was named as Imam.

The will cited "fundamentally altered conditions in the world" as part of the rationale for selecting a younger successor:

"In view of the fundamentally altered conditions in the world [which] has provoked many changes, including the discoveries of atomic science, I am convinced that it is in the best interests of the Nizari Ismaili community that I should be succeeded by a young man who has been brought up and developed during recent years and in the midst of the new age, and who brings a new outlook on life to his office."

This statement was later used by some within the community to frame al-Husseini as an "Imam of the Atomic Age," a phrase that has appeared in various publications but has no official doctrinal status. The will also recommended that the new Imam, during his early years in the role, consult his grandmother, Om Habibeh Aga Khan, on general matters.

== Nizari Ismaili Imamate ==
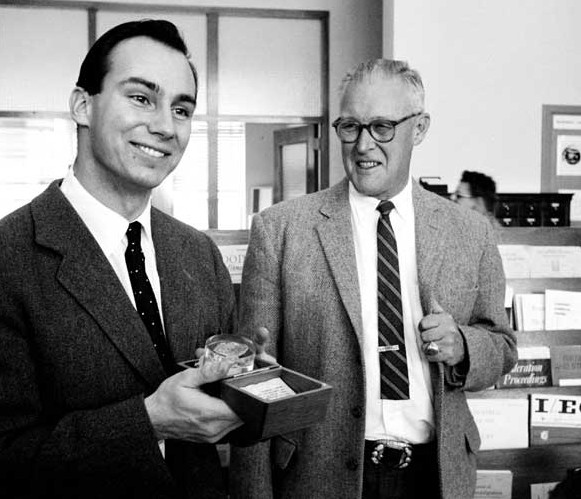
Karim al-Husseini receiving a gift of trinitite, residue from the first nuclear bomb detonation, while visiting the Los Alamos National Laboratory in 1959.

Karim al-Husseini became the 49th hereditary Imam of the Nizari Ismaili Muslims in 1957 following the death of his grandfather. He was officially installed on 19 October 1957 and installation ceremonies were conducted at multiple locations between 1957 and 1958, during which he spoke about issues such as interethnic and interfaith relations.

In 1972, the government of Uganda, led by President Idi Amin, expelled people of South Asian origin, including many Nizari Ismailis, giving them 90 days to leave the country. Following this, Karim al-Husseini contacted Canadian Prime Minister Pierre Trudeau, which resulted in Canada accepting a significant number of displaced Ismailis. He also coordinated efforts to assist Ismailis displaced from Tanzania, Kenya, and Myanmar with resettlement in other countries, primarily in Asia, Europe, and North America. Most of the initial resettlement problems were overcome rapidly by Nizari Ismailis due to their educational backgrounds and high rates of literacy, as well as the efforts of the host countries, along with support from Nizari Ismaili community programmes.

Al-Husseini encouraged members of the Nizari Ismaili community in industrialised countries to support development initiatives in regions with significant Ismaili populations. Karim al-Husseini described the role of the Imam as involving both religious interpretation and attention to the social welfare of the community. He has emphasized the importance of engagement between Ismaili communities and the broader societies in which they live.

He was among the Shia signatories of the 2004 Amman Message, which addressed the inclusion of various denominations of Islam within the Muslim community.

During the 2006 controversy surrounding Pope Benedict XVI's lecture, Karim al-Husseini expressed concern over deteriorating interreligious relations and suggested the situation presented an opportunity for dialogue about religion and reason

When he was asked about his view on the consumption of alcohol in a 1965 interview with The Sunday Times, al-Husseini said, in line with Muslim teaching:

Our belief is that the thing which separates man from the animals is his power of thought. Anything that impedes this process is wrong. Therefore, alcohol is forbidden. I have never touched alcohol. But this, to me, is not a puritan prohibition. I don't want to drink. I've never wanted to drink. There's no pressure being placed on me by my religion.

In 2014, Karim al-Husseini became the first faith leader to address a joint session of the Parliament of Canada.

To mark the 25th anniversary of his Imamate from 1982 to 1983, several development projects were initiated, including the establishment of the $450 million Aga Khan University with its Faculty of Health Sciences and teaching hospital based in Karachi, Pakistan, expansion of schools and healthcare facilities in the Hunza region of northern Pakistan, and the establishment of the Aga Khan Rural Support Programme in Gujarat, India.

The 50th anniversary of his Imamate was observed from 2007 to 2008, during which Karim al-Husseini made official visits to various countries and met with government officials to discuss ongoing and future initiatives. During this period, the Golden Jubilee Games, a sports event for Nizari Ismailis, was organized in Kenya and later continued in other locations. During his visit to Houston in Texas, he announced the establishment of the Ismaili Center Houston.

The 60th anniversary of his tenure was observed from 2017 to 2018, marked by various events including concerts and arts festivals. In 2018, the Henrique de Mendonça Palace in Lisbon was designated as the Seat of the Ismaili Imamat.

=== Ismaili Constitution ===
In 1986, al-Husseini promulgated a constitution for the Nizari Ismaili community, which was amended in 1998. The document outlines the governance structure and the role of the Imam within the community.

== Business activities ==
=== Thoroughbred horse racing ===
The racing colors of Karim al-Husseini

Al-Husseini's racing horse businesses brought in considerable income. He owned and operated the largest horse racing and breeding operation in France, the French horse auction house, Arqana, Gilltown Stud near Kilcullen in Ireland, and other breeding/stud farms in Europe.

He operated a large horse racing and breeding operation at his estate Aiglemont, in the town of Gouvieux in the Picardy region of France – about 4 kilometres (2 1/2 miles) west of the Chantilly Racecourse. In 1977, he paid £1.3 million for the bloodstock owned by Anna Dupré and in 1978, £4.7 million for the bloodstock of Marcel Boussac. He was said to be France's most influential owner-breeder and record winner of The Prix de Diane, sometimes referred to as the French Oaks.

Al-Husseini owned Gilltown Stud near Kilcullen, Ireland, and the Haras de Bonneval breeding farm at Le Mesnil-Mauger in France. In March 2005, he purchased the Calvados stud farms, the Haras d'Ouilly in Pont-d'Ouilly and the Haras de Val-Henry in Livarot. Haras d'Ouilly had been owned by such horsemen as the Duc Decazes, François Dupré, and Jean-Luc Lagardère.

In 2006, he became the majority shareholder of French horse auction house Arqana.

On 27 October 2009 it was announced that Sea the Stars, regarded by many as one of the greatest racehorses of all time, would stand stud at his Gilltown Stud in Ireland.

His unbeaten homebred filly, Zarkava, won the 2008 Prix de l'Arc de Triomphe. His homebred colt, Harzand, won the 2016 Epsom Derby and the 2016 Irish Derby.

Al-Husseini was the lead owner of Shergar, the Irish racehorse that was kidnapped from Ballymany stud farm in County Kildare, Ireland, by masked men in 1983 and held for ransom. He and the other co-owners refused to pay a ransom, and the horse was not recovered. Following the abduction of Shergar in 1983, al-Husseini, law enforcement, and members of the public suspected the Provisional Irish Republican Army (IRA), although the group denied involvement. In 1999, former IRA member Sean O'Callaghan claimed in his autobiography that the IRA had carried out the abduction. Shergar had become a prominent symbol in Ireland, and the incident prompted public backlash, including among individuals sympathetic to the republican cause.

=== Other business ventures ===
Al-Husseini was involved in multiple business ventures, in such areas as communications media and luxury hotels. In 1959 he founded the Kenyan media company Nation Media Group, which among others owns Daily Nation and Sunday Nation.

In the 1990s, he had a group of US$400 a night Italian luxury hotels, called Ciga. Through his for-profit AKFED, he was the largest shareholder in the Serena Hotels chain.

== Other activities ==
=== Aga Khan Development Network ===
Karim established the Aga Khan Development Network (AKDN), a group of affiliated institutions operating primarily in developing regions. The network includes over 200 agencies and, as of the latest available data, employs approximately 80,000 staff. Funding sources include contributions from members of the Ismaili community as well as partnerships with governments and international organisations. AKDN's activities span areas such as health, education, culture, rural development, financial services, and economic initiatives, with a focus on parts of Africa, South and Central Asia, and the Middle East.

Entities affiliated with the AKDN include the Aga Khan University, the University of Central Asia, the Aga Khan Fund for Economic Development (a for-profit arm), the Aga Khan Foundation, the Aga Khan Trust for Culture, and service organisations in education, health, microfinance, and infrastructure. One of its commercial holdings, the Serena Hotels Group, operates a chain of hotels and resorts in several countries across Africa and Asia. The network also administers the Aga Khan Award for Architecture, an architectural prize for projects addressing Muslim societies and contexts.

In 1977, al-Husseini founded the Institute of Ismaili Studies in London and served as chair of its board of governors.

Focus Humanitarian Assistance, an AKDN affiliate, coordinates emergency response operations. Its past activities include disaster relief efforts following the 2005 earthquake in Pakistan and the 2004 Indian Ocean tsunami.

Projects linked to AKDN or its partner institutions include the Aga Khan Museum in Toronto, the Delegation of the Ismaili Imamate and the Global Centre for Pluralism in Ottawa, the Al-Azhar Parkk in Cairo, the Bagh-e Babur restoration in Kabul, the Sunder Nursery in Delhi, and a network of full IB residential schools known as the Aga Khan Academies.

In a 2006 public address in Germany, al-Husseini commented on how external observers often categorize the work of the Aga Khan Development Network as philanthropy or enterprise. He stated that, from the perspective of the Ismaili Imamate, such activities are considered part of the Imam's institutional responsibilities rather than being separate from his religious role.

He was served as a vice-president of the Royal Commonwealth Society until 2025.

In March 2019, al-Husseini was named the Global Founding Patron of the Prince's Trust Group by Charles, then the Prince of Wales. According to the organisation, support linked to this role contributed to programmes reaching over 30,000 young people between 2019 and 2025.

The Aga Khan Development Network is also a founding partner of the Paris Peace Forum, launched in 2018 on the centenary of the World War I Armistice. The network serves as a strategic partner and participates in the forum's executive and governance bodies.

=== Promotion of Islamic architecture ===
In 1977, Karim al-Husseini established the Aga Khan Award for Architecture, a triennial award intended to recognize architectural projects that address contemporary design alongside social, environmental, and historical contexts and rejuvenation in Muslim societies. The award cumulatively carries a prize of US$1 million and is administered by an independent jury appointed for each award cycle.

In 1979, Harvard University and the Massachusetts Institute of Technology (MIT) launched the Aga Khan Program for Islamic Architecture (AKPIA), supported by an endowment from al-Husseini. The program offers academic courses, lectures, and conferences related to Islamic architecture and urbanism. It also supports research at both institutions. At MIT, students may complete a Master of Science in Architectural Studies with a focus in the program.

== Personal life ==
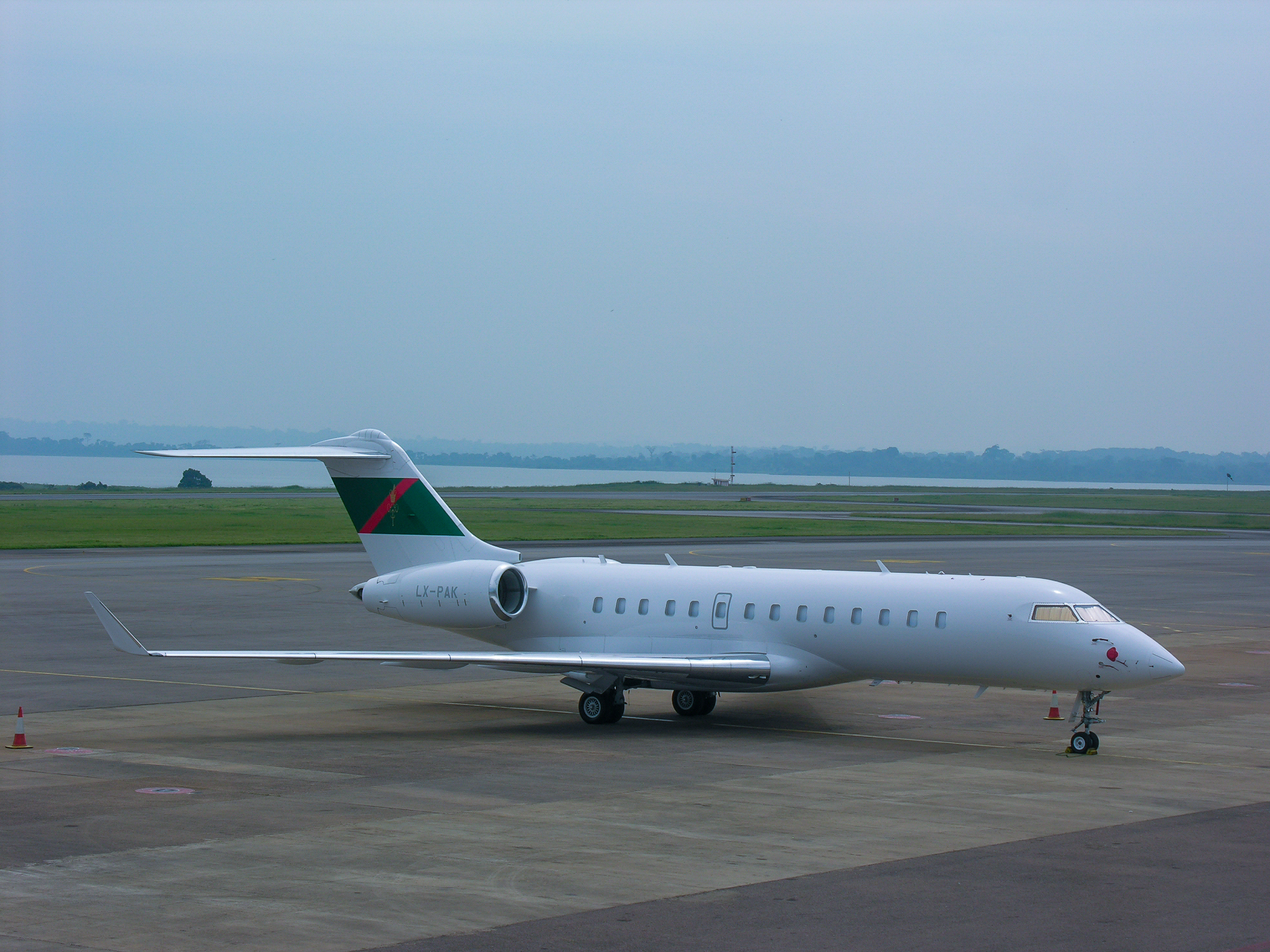
Karim al-Husseini's aircraft sitting at Entebbe International Airport, Uganda, in 2006

He avoided most parties and never appeared in gossip columns. In 1969, al-Husseini married former British model Sarah Frances Croker Poole, who assumed the name Salimah Aga Khan upon marrying him. Sarah Frances was a divorcee, having previously been married to Lord James Charles Crichton-Stuart, third son of John Crichton-Stuart, 5th Marquess of Bute.

The wedding ceremonies were held on 22 October 1969 (civil) and 28 October 1969 (religious) at Karim Aga Khan's home in Paris. Al-Husseini and Begum Salimah had one daughter and two sons together, Zahra Aga Khan (born 18 September 1970), Rahim Aga Khan (born 12 October 1971), and Hussain Aga Khan (born 10 April 1974). By 1984, al-Husseini and Salimah had taken to living separate lives. In 1994, the couple's divorce was made public.

On 30 May 1998, al-Husseini married Gabriele Renate Thyssen at his residence, Château de Aiglemont, in Gouvieux, France. Upon marriage, she assumed the name Inaara Aga Khan. Thyssen, born in 1963, had previously been married to Prince Karl Emich of Leiningen, with whom she had a daughter, Teresa.

The couple had one son, Aly Muhammad Aga Khan, born on 7 March 2000. They announced their intention to divorce in October 2004. A divorce settlement was reached in the French courts in September 2011, with the settlement amount finalised in March 2014.

Al-Husseini was involved in competitive yachting and maritime sports. In 1967, he founded the Yacht Club Costa Smeralda in Porto Cervo, Sardinia, and served as its president for several decades. The club became known for hosting international sailing events.

He also owned multiple yachts, including Alamshar, a 164-foot vessel named after one of his racehorses. Media reports estimated its cost at approximately £100 million.

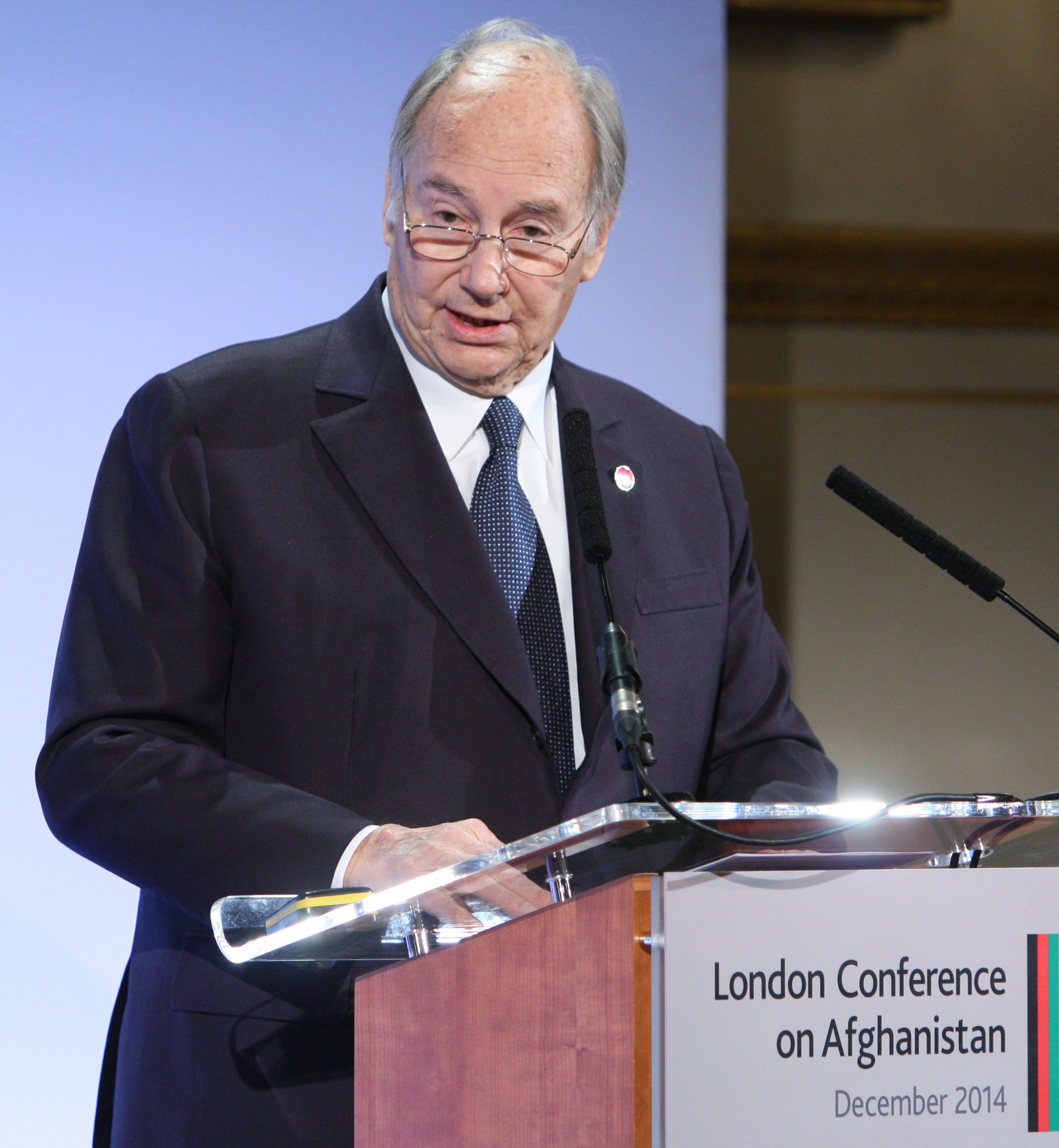
Karim al-Husseini in 2014

Al-Husseini owned Bombardier jets. In 2005, it was reported that he owned a Bombardier Global Express and another transcontinental jet.

=== Personal finances ===
In 2009, Forbes estimated al-Husseini's net worth at approximately US$1 billion, and in 2013, Vanity Fair reported that his fortune had been estimated at US$13.3 billion. Forbes also listed him among the world's fifteen wealthiest individuals referred to as "royals", though he did not exercise sovereignty over any state or territory.

His personal assets were reported to include multiple estates, a private island in the Bahamas (Bell Island), a fleet of private jets, and Alamshar, a high-speed yacht reportedly valued at £100 million. He also owned several stud farms and hundreds of racehorses. His primary residence was the Aiglemont estate in Gouvieux, France.

== Death ==
Al-Husseini died aged 88 at his residence in Lisbon, Portugal, on 4 February 2025. In his will, he named his son Rahim Al-Hussaini as his successor, a designation that the Nizari Ismaili community regards as the appointment of the 50th Imam, as Aga Khan V.

A private funeral was held in Lisbon on 8 February. Attendees included Portuguese President Marcelo Rebelo de Sousa, Lisbon Mayor Carlos Moedas, and foreign dignitaries such as Trudeau and former Spanish king Juan Carlos I. On 9 February, al-Husseini was buried in the Mausoleum of Aga Khan in Aswan, Egypt, where his grandfather is also interred.

== Titles, styles and honours ==
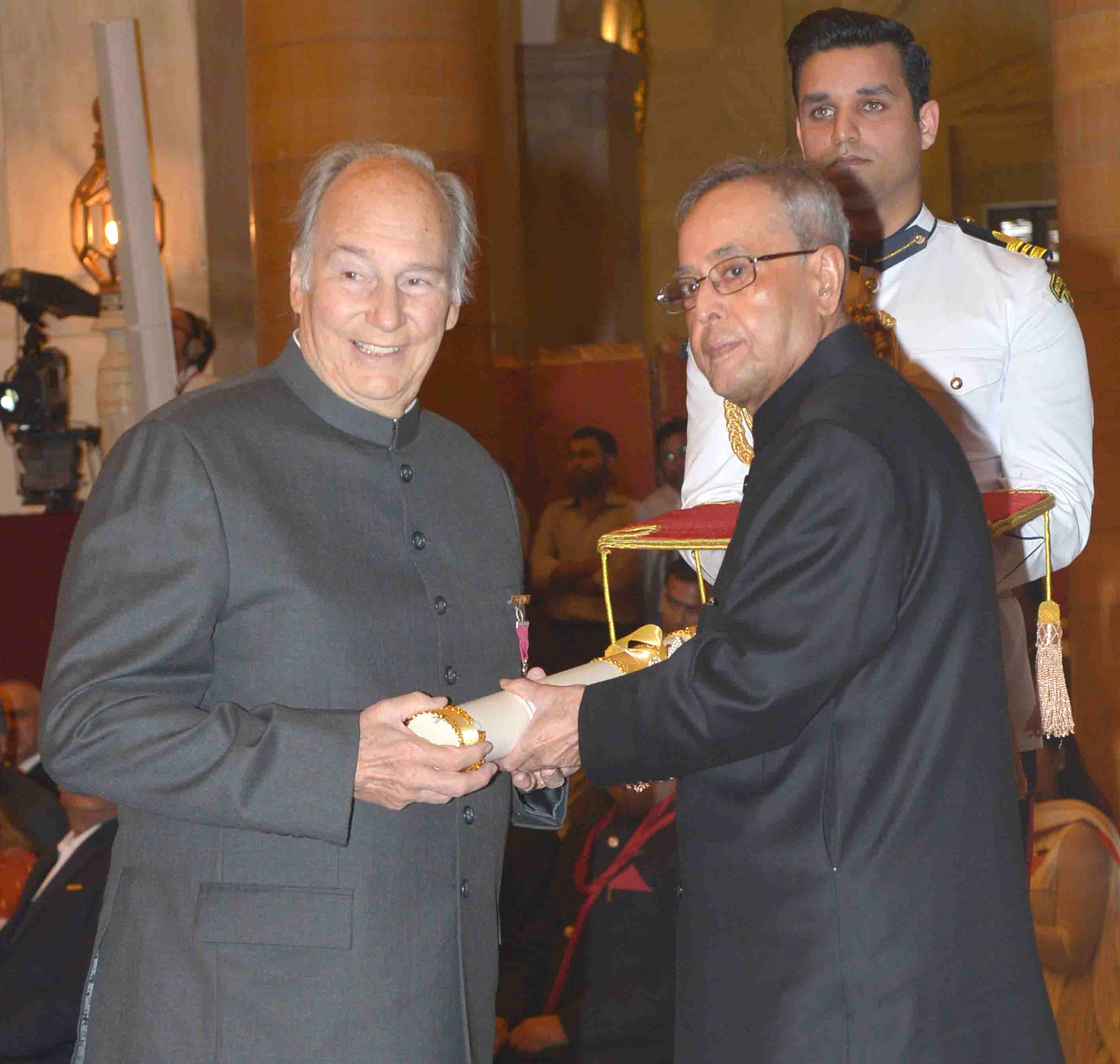
President of India Shri Pranab Mukherjee presents the Padma Vibhushan award to al-Husseini in New Delhi on 8 April 2015

The Aga Khans claim the titles of Prince and Princess by virtue of their descent from Fath Ali Shah of the Persian Qajar dynasty. The title was officially recognised by the British government in 1938.

The honorific Aga Khan (from Agha and Khan) was first given to Hasan Ali Shah (The Aga Khan I) at the age of thirteen when he, as the young Imam, with his mother decided to go to the Qajar court in Tehran to obtain justice upon his father's death and was eventually successful. Those who had been involved in murder were punished. The title remained hereditary amongst his successors.

In 1957, following the death of his grandfather, Karim al-Husseini was granted the style of His Highness by Elizabeth II of the United Kingdom. The style had previously been granted to Aga Khan III by the British Crown in 1887 and was extended to his successor shortly after his accession as Imam.

Additionally, the style of His Royal Highness was granted in 1959 by Mohammad Reza Pahlavi, the Shah of Iran, later overthrown in the Iranian Revolution of 1979, but al-Husseini preferred to use the style of His Highness.

France Galop a French Group has announced that the One Prix d’Ispahan has been renamed the Prix Aga Khan IV. Guillaume de Saint-Seine, president of France Galop, said: “It was the wish of France Galop, in consultation with the Aga Khan family, that one of the Group One races in the French racing calendar, the Prix d’Ispahan, should now bear the name of the late His Highness the Aga Khan IV, so the racing world will remember this remarkable figure.

=== Honours ===
- Bahrain:
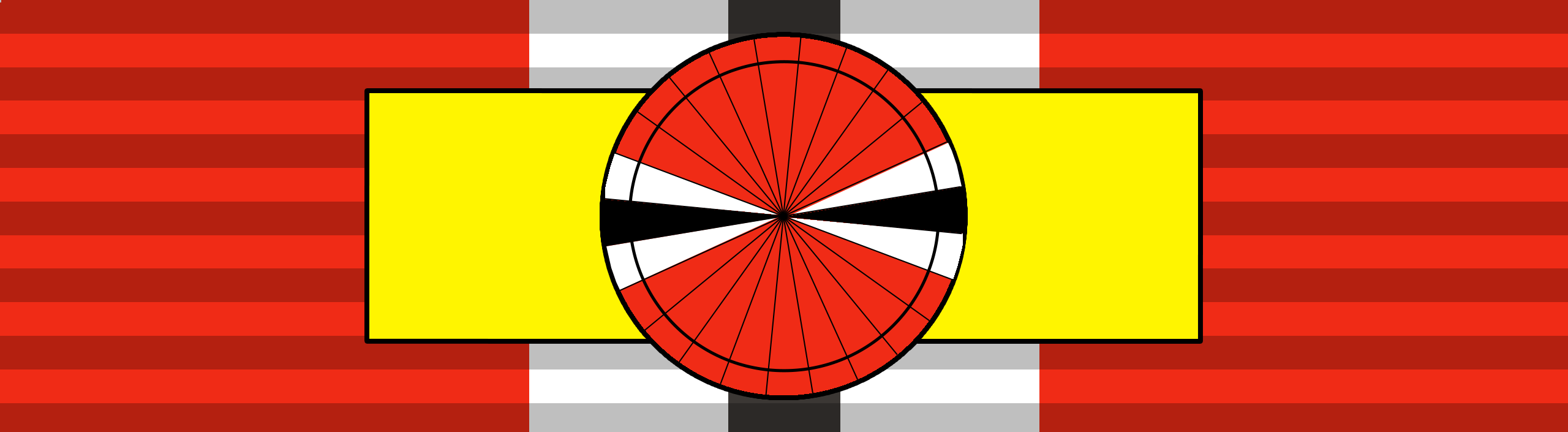
  - Member 1st Class of the Order of Bahrain (2003)
- Canada:
  - Honorary Companion of the Order of Canada (CC, 2005)
- Comoros:
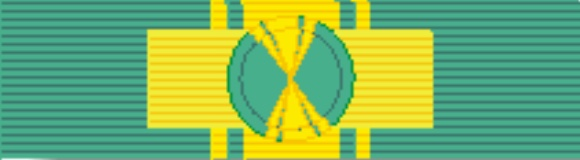
  - Grand Cross of the Order of the Green Crescent (1966)
- France:
  - Grand Cross of the Legion of Honour (2018)
  - Commander of the Order of Arts and Letters (2010)
- India:
  - Padma Vibhushan (2015)
- Iran:
  - Grand Cordon of the Order of the Crown (1967)
  - Commemorative Medal of the 2500th Anniversary of the founding of the Persian Empire (14 October 1971)
- Italy:
  - Knight Grand Cross of the Order of Merit of the Italian Republic (1977) (Note: The Aga Khan is the first Muslim to receive the honour.)
  - Knight of the Order of Merit for Labour (1988)
- Ivory Coast:
  - Grand Cross of the National Order of the Ivory Coast (1965)
- Kenya:
  - Chief of the Order of the Golden Heart of Kenya (CGH, 2007)
- Madagascar:
  - Grand Cross 2nd Class of the National Order of Madagascar (1966)
- Mali:
  - Grand Cross of the National Order of Mali (2008)
- Mauritania:
  - Commander of the National Order of Merit (1960)
- Morocco:
  - Grand Cordon of the Order of the Throne (1986)
- Pakistan:
  - Nishan-e-Pakistan (NPk, 1983)
  - Nishan-i-Imtiaz (NI, 1970)
- Portugal:
  - Grand Cross of the Order of Liberty (GCL, 2017)
  - Grand Cross of the Order of Christ (GCC, 2005)
  - Grand Cross of the Order of Merit (GCM, 1998)
  - Grand Cross of the Order of Prince Henry (GCIH, 1960)
- Senegal:
  - Grand Officer of the National Order of the Lion (1982)
- Spain:
  - Grand Cross of the Order of Civil Merit (1991)
- Tajikistan:
  - Recipient of the Order of Friendship (1998)
- Uganda:
  - Grand Master of the Most Excellent Order of the Pearl of Africa (2017)
- United Kingdom:
  - Ordinary Knight Commander of the Order of the British Empire (KBE, 2003)
- (Republic of Upper Volta) Upper Volta:
  - Grand Cross of the National Order of Upper Volta (1965)
- Zanzibar:
  - Grand Cross of the Order of the Brilliant Star of Zanzibar (1957)

=== Honorary degrees ===
- Canada: Honorary LL.D. degree, Simon Fraser University (2018)
- Canada: Honorary LL.D. degree, University of British Columbia (2018)
- Canada: Honorary LL.D. degree, University of Calgary (2018)
- Canada: Honorary LL.D. degree, McGill University (1983)
- Canada: Honorary LL.D. degree, McMaster University (1987)
- Canada: Honorary LL.D. degree, University of Toronto (2004)
- Canada: Honorary LL.D. degree, University of Alberta (2009)
- Canada: Honorary DUniv degree, University of Ottawa (2012)
- Canada: Honorary D.S.Litt. degree, University of Toronto (2013)
- Canada: Honorary D.Litt. degree in medieval studies, Pontifical Institute of Mediaeval Studies (2016)
- Pakistan: Honorary LL.D. degree, University of Sindh (1970)
- Portugal: Honorary PhD degree, NOVA University of Lisbon (2017)
- United Kingdom: Honorary LL.D. degree, University of Wales (1993)
- United Kingdom: Honorary D.D. degree, University of Cambridge (2009)
- United States: Honorary LL.D. degree, Brown University (1996)
- United States: Honorary LL.D. degree, Harvard University (2008)

=== Awards ===
- Canada: Key to the City of Ottawa (2005)
- Canada: Honorary Canadian citizenship (2010)
- Canada: Key to the City of Toronto (2022)
- Canada: Honorary Fellow of the Royal Architectural Institute of Canada, Ottawa (2025)
- France: Silver Medal of the Académie d'Architecture (1991)
- France: Insignia of Honour, International Union of Architects (2001)
- France: Associate Foreign Member, Académie des Beaux-Arts (2008)
- France: Philanthropic Entrepreneur of the Year, by Le Nouvel Économiste, Paris (2009)
- Germany: Die Quadriga Award, the United We Care Award (2005)
- Germany: Tolerance Prize of the Evangelical Academy of Tutzing (2006)
- Italy: Honorary Citizen of the Town of Arzachena (Sardinia) (1962)
- Italy: Gold Mercury Ad Personam Award, non-state organization (1982)
- Ivory Coast: Freeman of Abidjan, and presented with a Key to the City of Abidjan (1960)
- Jordan: One of The 500 Most Influential Muslims in the world, by Royal Islamic Strategic Studies Centre (2009–13)
- Kazakhstan: State Award for Peace and Progress (2002)
- Kazakhstan: Honoured Educator of the Republic of Kazakhstan (2008)
- Kenya: Honorary Citizen of the Town of Kisumu (1981)
- Madagascar: Key to the City of Majunga (1966)
- Mali: Honorary Citizen of the Islamic Ummah of Timbuktu (2003)
- Mali: Citizen of Honour of the Municipality of Timbuktu (2008)
- Pakistan: Honorary Colonel of the 6th Lancers by the Pakistani Army (1970)
- Pakistan: Honorary Citizen of Lahore, and presented with a key to the City of Lahore (1980)
- Pakistan: Honorary Membership, Pakistan Medical Association, Sindh (1981)
- Pakistan: Key to the City of Karachi (1981)
- Pakistan: Honorary Fellowship of the College of Physicians and Surgeons Pakistan (CPSP) (1985)
- Portugal: Key to the City of Lisbon (1996)
- Portugal: Foreign Member, Class of Humanities, by Lisbon Academy of Sciences (2009)
- Portugal: 2013 North–South Prize of the Council of Europe (2014)
- Portugal: Key to the City of Porto (2019)
- Scotland: Carnegie Medal for Philanthropy (2005)
- Spain: Guest of Honour of Granada (1991)
- Spain: Honorary Citizen of Granada (1991)
- Spain: Gold Medal of the City of Granada (1998)
- Spain: Royal Toledo Foundation (Real Fundación de Toledo) Award (2006)
- Sweden: Archon Award, International Nursing Honour Society, Sigma Theta Tau International (2001)
- Tanzania: Honorary Citizen of Dar es Salaam (2005)
- United Kingdom: The Gold Mercury International "AD PERSONAM" Award (1982)
- United Kingdom: Honorary Fellowship, Royal Institute of British Architects (1991)
- United Kingdom: Andrew Carnegie Medal of Philanthropy (2005)
- United Kingdom: Winner of the 10th annual Peter O'Sullevan Award at the Savoy in London (2006)
- United States: Thomas Jefferson Memorial Foundation Medal in Architecture, University of Virginia (1984)
- United States: Institute Honor of the American Institute of Architects (1984)
- United States: Honorary Member of the American Institute of Architects (1992)
- United States: Foreign Honorary Member of the American Academy of Arts and Sciences (1996)
- United States: Hadrian Award, World Monuments Fund (1996)
- United States: Vincent Scully Prize, National Building Museum (2005)
- United States: Key to the City of Austin (2008)
- United States: UCSF medal (2011)
- United States: Key to the City of Sugar Land, Texas (2018)
- United States: ULI J.C. Nichols Prize for Visionaries in Urban Development, Los Angeles (2011)
- Uzbekistan: Honorary Citizen of the City of Samarkand and presented with a Key to the City of Samarkand (1992)

== Hashemite ancestry ==
Ancestors of Aga Khan IV

8. Aga Khan II
4. Aga Khan III
9. Shams al-Muluk
2. Aly Khan
5. Cleope Teresa Magliano
1. Aga Khan IV
12. John Yarde-Buller, 2nd Baron Churston
6. John Yarde-Buller, 3rd Baron Churston
13. Barbara Yelverton
3. Taj-ud-dawlah
14. Alfred John Smither
7. Jessie Smither
15. Jessica Henrietta Pococke

=== Patrilineal descent ===
Patrilineal descent

Shah Karim al-Hussaini Aga Khan's patriline is the line from which he is descended father to son.

Nizari Imams of the Fatimid Dynasty

1. Adnan
2. Ma'ad ibn Adnan
3. Nizar ibn Ma'ad
4. Mudar ibn Nizar
5. Ilyas ibn Mudar
6. Mudrikah ibn Ilyas
7. Khuzayma ibn Mudrika
8. Kinanah ibn Khuzayma
9. An-Nadr ibn Kinanah
10. Malik ibn Al-Nadr
11. Fihr ibn Malik
12. Ghalib ibn Fihr
13. Lu'ayy ibn Ghalib
14. Ka'b ibn Lu'ayy
15. Murrah ibn Ka'b
16. Kilab ibn Murrah b. ca. 372
17. Qusay ibn Kilab ca. 400-ca. 480
18. Abd Manaf ibn Qusai
19. Hashim ibn Abd Manaf, ca. 464-ca. 497
20. Abd al-Muttalib, ca. 497–578
21. Abu Talib ibn Abd al-Muttalib, 535–619
22. 4th Caliph and 1st Imam Ali ibn Abu Talib, 601–661, cousin and son-in-law of the Prophet Muhammad
23. 2nd Imam Husayn ibn Ali, 626–680
24. 3rd Imam Ali ibn Husayn Zayn al-Abidin, 659–713
25. 4th Imam Muhammad al-Baqir, 677–733
26. 5th Imam Jafar al-Sadiq, ca. 702–765
27. 6th Imam Ismail ibn Jafar, ca. 722-ca. 762
28. 7th Imam Muhammad ibn Ismail, 740–813
29. 8th Imam Ahmad al-Wafi, 795/746-827/828
30. 9th Imam Muhammad at-Taqi (Isma'ili), 813/814-839/840
31. 10th Imam Radi Abdullah, 832–881
32. 11th Imam Caliph Abdullah al-Mahdi Billah, 873–934
33. 12th Imam Caliph Al-Qa'im, 893–946
34. 13th Imam Caliph Al-Mansur Billah, 914–953
35. 14th Imam Caliph Al-Mu'izz li-Din Allah, 932–975
36. 15th Imam Caliph Al-Aziz Billah, 955–996
37. 16th Imam Caliph Al-Hakim bi-Amr Allah, 985–1021
38. 17th Imam Caliph Ali az-Zahir, 1005–1036
39. 18th Imam Caliph Al-Mustansir Billah, 1029–1094
40. 19th Imam Nizar al-Mustafa, 1045–1095
41. 20th Imam Ali Al-Husayn Al-Hadi, 1076–1132
42. 21st Imam Al-Muhtadi, Muhammad I, 1106–1157
43. 22nd Imam Al-Qahir, Hasan I, 1126–1162
44. 23rd Imam Hassan II of Alamut (also referred to as 'Alā Zikrihi-s-Salām), 1142/1145-1166
45. 24th Imam Muhammad II of Alamut, 1148–1210
46. 25th Imam Hassan III of Alamut, 1187–1221
47. 26th Imam Muhammad III of Alamut, 1211–1255
48. 27th Imam Rukn al-Din Khurshah, ca. 1230-1256/1257
49. 28th Imam Shams al-Din (Nizari), 1257–1310
50. 29th Imam Qasim Shah, 1310–1368
51. 30th Imam Islam Shah, d. 1424
52. 31st Imam Muhammad ibn Islam Shah, d. 1464
53. 32nd Imam Ali Shah Qalandar, al-Mustansir Billah II, d. 1480
54. 33rd Imam Abd-us-Salam Shah, d. 1494
55. 34th Imam Abbas Shah Gharib, al-Mustansir Billah III, d. 1498
56. 35th Imam Abuzar Ali Nur Shah, d. ca. 1509
57. 36th Imam Murād Mīrzā, d. 1574
58. 37th Imam Dhu-l-Fiqar Ali Zulfiqar Ali, Khalilullah I, d. 1634
59. 38th Imam Nur al-Din Ali, d. 1671
60. 39th Imam Ali, Khalilullah II, d. 1680
61. 40th Imam Shah Nizar II, d. 1722
62. 41st Imam Sayed Ali, d. ca. 1736
63. 42nd Imam Al-Hassan Ali Beg, d. ca. 1747
64. 43rd Imam Sayed Jafar, Al-Qasim Ali, d. ca. 1756
65. 44th Imam Abū-l-Hasan ʻAlī, d. 1792
66. 45th Imam Shah Khalilullah III, 1740–1817
67. 46th Imam Hasan Ali Shah, Aga Khan I, 1804–1881
68. 47th Imam Aqa Ali Shah, Aga Khan II, 1830–1885
69. 48th Imam Sultan Muhammad Shah, Aga Khan III, 1877–1957
70. Aly Khan, 1911–1960
71. 49th Imam Shah Karim Al-Hussaini, Aga Khan IV, 1936–2025

== Cultural depictions ==
Al-Husseini is mentioned in the 1969 Peter Sarstedt song Where Do You Go To (My Lovely)?.

== See also ==
- Aga Khan affair, a 2017 political scandal in Canada involving Prime Minister Justin Trudeau and Aga Khan IV.
- Aga Khan Museum, exhibiting Islamic artefacts and fine arts in Toronto, Canada.
