= Kendra Spears (Salwa Aga Khan) =

American fashion model (born 1988)

- Born: August 5, 1988 (age 38)
- Spouse: Prince Rahim Aga Khan (m. 2013; div. 2022)
- Issue: Irfan Aga Khan; Sinan Aga Khan
- Father: Gregory J. Spears
- Mother: Susan Mapes
- Occupation: Fashion model

Kendra Spears (formerly Princess Salwa Aga Khan; born August 5, 1988) is an American fashion model. She commenced her modelling career in 2008, participating in the Ford Models Supermodel of the World and walking in New York Fashion Week. She has walked the runway for Gucci, Christian Lacroix, Lanvin, Hermès, and Valentino. Salwa has appeared on the covers of Amica, Cover Magazine, Vogue China, Vogue Japan, Vogue Germany, Vogue México y Latinoamérica, Elle, Allure, and Numero and in editorials in Dazed & Confused, V, and Vogue Italia. She has been the face of Prada, Armani's Code Fragrance, and Moschino's Pink Bouquet fragrance and modelled in advertisement campaigns for Calvin Klein, Etro, Diane von Fürstenberg, Peek & Cloppenburg, and The Limited.

In 2013, she married Rahim al-Hussaini (now the Aga Khan V), the eldest son of Aga Khan IV, at the Château de Bellerive in Switzerland. Upon her marriage, she converted to Islam and adopted the name Salwa, meaning "solace" in Arabic. She and Rahim have two sons. They divorced in 2022 and she returned to modeling.

== Early life and education ==
Kendra Irene Spears was born on August 5, 1988, in Seattle, Washington. She graduated from South Kitsap High School with an associate's degree acquired through a dual-credit high school and college program (Running Start). She then attended Portland State University to study sociology, and obtained a BA in sociology from the University of Washington. In January 2008, Salwa began her modeling career in New York City and went on to become a successful fashion model.

== Career ==
In January 2008, Salwa participated in the Ford Models Supermodel of the World competition, after winning a modeling contest via MySpace. After the competition ended, she gained a contract with Ford Models of New York and debuted at New York Fashion Week in September 2008. After success in New York, Salwa went on to walk for the most prestigious designers in Milan and Paris, including Gucci, Christian Lacroix, Lanvin, Hermès, and Valentino.

Shortly after the show season ended in October, Salwa appeared on a succession of covers of the Danish fashion magazine Cover and the Italian magazine Amica. The covers were followed by a Dazed & Confused editorial featuring new faces of the season as well as editorials for V and Vogue Italia.

For the Fall 2009 season, Salwa was photographed by Steven Meisel as one of the faces of Prada. Shortly afterwards, she moved back to Seattle to complete her degree at University of Washington. Although the move limited her ability to work, she still managed to shoot advertising campaigns including Stefanel shot by Mario Testino, Calvin Klein shot by Alasdair McLellan, The Limited shot by Patrick Demarchelier, Etro, and Diane von Fürstenberg.

Throughout Salwa's career, she has been photographed for the cover of a number of Vogue magazines worldwide, including Vogue China, Vogue Japan, Vogue Germany, and Vogue Mexico. She has also appeared on the covers of international editions of Elle, Allure, and Numero and in adverts for Calvin Klein, Diane von Fürstenberg, Peek & Cloppenburg, Etro, and The Limited.

Salwa was the face of Armani Code Fragrance and Moschino Pink Bouquet Fragrance in 2012.

== Married life ==
On April 26, 2013, Aga Khan IV announced the engagement of his eldest son, Rahim Aga Khan, to Spears. The couple married on August 31, 2013, in Geneva, Switzerland, with Spears taking the name "Salwa". They have two children: Irfan (b. April 11, 2015) and Sinan (b. January 2, 2017). The couple divorced in February 2022.
