= Islam Shah (Nizari Imam) =

Nizari Ismaili Shia Imam (post-Alamut period)

30th Imam of Nizari Isma'ilism (Qasim-Shahi line)
- Predecessor: Qasim Shah
- Successor: Muhammad ibn Islam Shah
- House: Nizari Ismaili Imamate (Qasim-Shahi branch)
- Religion: Islam (Ismaili Shia)

Islam Shah was 30th Nizari Ismaili Imam and is considered in Nizari Ismaili tradition as the successor to Qasim Shah in the Qasim-Shahi line of Imams during the post-Alamut period of Nizari Ismaili history.

== Life ==
Modern academic scholarship notes that the post-Alamut period of Nizari Ismaili history is sparsely documented in contemporary external sources, and much of the Imamate succession is reconstructed from later Ismaili genealogical traditions.

Islam Shah is recognized within the Qasim-Shahi lineage as part of the continuation of the Nizari Imamate following Qasim Shah. This line is historically significant as it leads to the present-day Nizari Ismaili Imams, known as the Aga Khans.

Due to the limited historical record from this period, detailed biographical information about individual Imams is not securely preserved in independent historical sources.
