= Henrique de Mendonça =

Portuguese capitalist (1864–1942)

Henrique de Mendonça GOC GCM GOIP
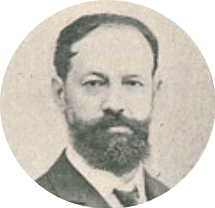
- Born: 4 February 1864; Lisbon, Kingdom of Portugal
- Died: 1 November 1942 (aged 78); Lisbon, Portuguese Republic
- Occupations: Businessman, landowner

Henrique José Monteiro de Mendonça GOC GCM GOIP (4 February 1864 – 1 November 1942) was an influential Portuguese capitalist in Lisbon and important landowner in the Portuguese colony of São Tomé and Príncipe; he was one of the protagonists of the economic phenomenon that saw that colony turn into one of the world's main producers and exporters of cocoa in the early 20th century.

Henrique de Mendonça was President of the Portuguese Chamber of Commerce and Industry from 1911 to 1913, and, from 1930 to 1942, National President of the Portuguese Red Cross.

He commissioned architect Miguel Ventura Terra a mansion in the Avenidas Novas, a new area of the city of Lisbon created as it expanded north absorbing nearby rural areas and farmlands. The works lasted from 1900 to 1909 and, that year, the project received the prestigious Valmor Prize. Following its purchase in 2016 by the Ismaili Imamat, the Aga Khan IV officially designated the palace as the "Diwan of the Ismaili Imamat".

== Distinctions ==
=== National orders ===
- Grand Officer of the Order of Christ (13 January 1920)
- Grand Cross of the Order of Merit (17 June 1933)
- Grand Officer of the Order of Public Instruction (24 May 1927)
