= Muhammad ibn Islam Shah =

Nizari Ismaili Shia Imam

Muhammad bin Islam Shah

31st Imam of Nizari Isma'ilism (Qasim-Shahi line)
- Predecessor: Islam Shah (Nizari Imam)
- Successor: Al-Mustansir Billah II (Nizari imam)
- House: Nizari Ismaili Imamate (Qasim-Shahi branch)
- Religion: Islam (Ismaili Shia)

Muhammad bin Islam Shah was the 31st Nizari Ismaili who is considered as a successor of Imam Islam Shah in the Qasim-Shahi line of imams during the post-Alamut period of Nizari Ismaili history.

== Life ==
Modern scholarship describes the post-Alamut period of Nizari Ismaili history as a phase in which the Imamate continued but is sparsely documented in contemporary external historical sources.

Muhammad bin Islam Shah is placed in the Qasim-Shahi genealogical tradition as the successor to Islam Shah II, continuing the hereditary line of Imams preserved within Nizari Ismaili tradition.

Due to limited independent historical records from this period, detailed biographical information is not securely attested in academic sources, and much of the succession is reconstructed from later Ismaili genealogical traditions.
