= Nur al-Dahr Ali =

Imam (d. 1671)

Nūr al-Dahr ʿAlī (Arabic: نور الدهر علي) or Nūr al-Dīn ʿAlī (Persian: نور الدین علی) was the 38th imam of the Qasim-Shahi branch of the Nizari Isma'ili community.

Nur al-Dahr Ali succeeded his father Khalil Allah I when the latter died in March 1634, until his own death in November 1671. Like his father, he resided and was buried at Anjudan, where his tombstone survives to this day.

He was succeeded by his son, Khalil Allah II Ali.

== Sources ==
- Daftary, Farhad (2007). The Ismāʿı̄lı̄s: Their History and Doctrines (Second ed.). Cambridge: Cambridge University Press. ISBN 978-0-521-61636-2.

Nur al-Dahr Ali of the Ahl al-Bayt Banu Hashim Clan of the Banu Quraish Born: ? C.E Died: 1671 C.E.
Regnal titles
Shia Islam titles
Preceded by Khalil Allah I	38th Imam of Nizari Isma'ilism (Qasim-Shahi line); 1634–1671	Succeeded by Khalil Allah II Ali
