= Khalil Allah I =

37th imam of the Qasim-Shahi

Khalīl Allāh I (Persian: خليل الله اول), known in Nizari Isma'ili tradition by the Sufi name Dhūʾl-Faqār ʿAlī (Persian: ذو الفقار علی), was the 37th imam of the Qasim-Shahi branch of Nizari Isma'ilism.

Khalil Allah succeeded his father Murad Mirza when the latter died in 1574. Like his father, he resided in and was buried at Anjudan in central Persia, where his tombstone survives to this day. The tombstone gives the date of his death as March 1634.

Khalil Allah had close relations with the ruling Safavid dynasty. He married a princess, possibly a daughter of Shah Abbas I (r. 1588–1629), and in 1627, the Safavid ruler issued an edict exempting the Shi'a of Anjudan from certain taxes. As Farhad Daftary points out, the edict refers to the Anjudani Shi'a as Twelvers, indicating that Khalil Allah and his followers were hiding their true faith.

He was succeeded by his son, Nur al-Dahr Ali.

== Sources ==
- Daftary, Farhad (2007). The Ismāʿı̄lı̄s: Their History and Doctrines (Second ed.). Cambridge: Cambridge University Press. ISBN 978-0-521-61636-2.

Khalil Allah I of the Ahl al-Bayt Banu Hashim Clan of the Banu Quraish Born: ? C.E Died: 1634 C.E.
Regnal titles
Shia Islam titles
Preceded by Murad Mirza	37th Imam of Nizari Isma'ilism (Qasim-Shahi line); 1574–1634	Succeeded by Nur al-Dahr Ali
