= Qasim Shah =

Nizari Ismaili Shia Imam (14th century)

Imam Qasim Shah

29th Imam of Nizari Isma'ilism (Qasim-Shahi line)
- Predecessor: Shams al-Din Muhammad
- Successor: Islam Shah (Nizari Imam)
- House: Nizari Isma'ili Imamate (Qasim-Shahi branch)
- Religion: Islam (Ismaili Shia)

Qasim Shah was the 29th Imam of the Nizari Ismaili community. He was son of 28th Nizari Ismaili Imam, Imam Shamsuddin Mohammad and is seen as his rightful successor in Nizari Ismaili tradition following the split of the Nizari Ismaili Imamate into Qasim-Shahi and Muhammad-Shahi branches.

== Life ==
According to Ismaili historical reconstruction, after the death of Shams al-Din Muhammad (d. c. 1310), the Nizari Imamate divided into two lines: the Qasim-Shahi line and the Muhammad-Shahi (Mu'mini) line.

Qasim Shah is recognized in the Qasim-Shahi tradition as part of the continuation of the Imamate lineage that ultimately led to the modern Nizari Ismaili Imams.

Scholars note that detailed historical records for individual Imams in this period are limited, and much of the reconstruction of succession is based on later Ismaili genealogical sources rather than contemporary documentation.
