= Sayyid Ali (Nizari imam) =

Shia Islam iman

Sayyid ʿAlī (Persian: سید علی) was the 41st imam of the Qasim-Shahi branch of the Nizari Isma'ili community.

Sayyid Ali succeeded his father Shah Nizar II when the latter died in September 1722. Like his father, he resided at Kahak in central Persia, where he died in 1754.

He was buried in his father's mausoleum in Kahak; his tomb is located in the largest of the mausoleum's chambers. His son Sayyid Hasan Ali succeeded him.

== Sources ==
- Daftary, Farhad (2007). The Ismāʿı̄lı̄s: Their History and Doctrines (Second ed.). Cambridge: Cambridge University Press. ISBN 978-0-521-61636-2.

Shia Islam titles
Preceded by Shah Nizar II	41st Imam of Nizari Isma'ilism (Qasim-Shahi line); 1722–1754	Succeeded by Sayyid Hasan Ali
