= Khalil Allah II Ali =

Imam of the Nizari Isma'ili community

Khalīl Allāh II ʿAlī (Persian: خلیل الله ثانی علی) was the 39th imam of the Qasim-Shahi branch of the Nizari Isma'ili community.

Khalil Allah II Ali succeeded his father Nur al-Dahr Ali when the latter died in 1671, until his own death in January 1680. He was buried in a tomb in the mausoleum of his predecessor, al-Mustansir Billah III. Khalil Allah II Ali was the last Nizari imam to reside in Anjudan; his successor Shah Nizar II moved his residence to the nearby village of Kahak.

== Sources ==
- Daftary, Farhad (2007). The Ismāʿı̄lı̄s: Their History and Doctrines (Second ed.). Cambridge: Cambridge University Press. ISBN 978-0-521-61636-2.

Khalil Allah II Ali of the Ahl al-Bayt Banu Hashim Clan of the Banu Quraish Born: ? C.E Died: 1680 C.E.
Regnal titles
Shia Islam titles
Preceded by Nur al-Dahr Ali	39th Imam of Nizari Isma'ilism (Qasim-Shahi line); 1671–1680	Succeeded by Shah Nizar II
