= Shah Khalil Allah III =

45th Imam of the Nizari Isma'ili community

45th Hereditary Imam of the Nizari Isma'ilism Muslim
- In office 1792–1817
- Preceded by: Abu'l-Hasan Ali "Baqir Shah"
- Succeeded by: Aga Khan I
- Title: Shah Khalil Allah III

Personal life
- Born: Shah Khalil Allah III; 1740 Kerman, Sublime State of Iran
- Died: 1817 (aged 76–77) Yazd, Iran
- Spouse: Bibi Sarkara
- Children: Hasan Ali Shah (successor)
- Parents: Abu'l-Hasan Ali "Baqir Shah" (father); Bibi Sarkara (mother)

Religious life
- Religion: Isma'ilism
- Denomination: Isma'ilism
- School: Nizari
- Lineage: Fatimid

Shah Khalil Allah III (Persian: شاه خليل الله سوم; 1740–1817) was the 45th Imam of the Nizari Ismaili Shia Islam community. Khalilullah Ali III was born in 1740 in the city of Kerman. His upbringing in Mahallat, Iran, began under the care of his uncle, Mirza Muhammad Bakir at the age of two years, and got rudiments of his formal education at home. In 1792, he succeeded his father Seyyed Hasan Ali as Imam, as his eldest son. He moved the seat of the Imamate from Kirman to Kahak, from where he led for 20 years. His name of Shah Khalil Allah was a Ni'matullāhī Sufi name, which reflected the close relationship between the Nizaris and Ni'matullāhīs. In 1815, Shāh Khalīlullāh moved to Yazd in order to be closer to his Indian followers.

== Death and succession ==
Shāh Khalīlullāh died at the age of 77 in 1817 (along with several followers) as a result of a Twelver Shia cleric called Mulla Husayn Yazdi inciting a Twelver mob to attack the Imam's house as a follow-up to a dispute between some Nizaris and some Twelver shopkeepers. However, Yazdi's real aim may have been to weaken the spreading influence of the Nizaris. The Imam's house was also plundered in the attack. Mulla Husayn Yazdi was punished for his actions by Fat′h-Ali Shah Qajar (the second Qajar king of Iran), since the king and the Imam had been on good terms.

The Imam was buried in the holy city of Najaf, Iraq, in a mausoleum that also contains the bodies of some of his relatives and descendants. The Imam was the last to have spent his entire Imamate in Persia. He was succeeded by his eldest son Shāh Ḥassan ‘Alī, who was the first Nizari Imam to use the title Aga Khan, a practice that continues to the present day.

Following the Imam's death, the Ismailis of Iran were in a strong enough position to finally come out publicly and cease their use of taqiyya, which had been in force for over five hundred years.

== Sources ==
- Daftary, Farhad (2007). The Ismāʿı̄lı̄s: Their History and Doctrines (Second ed.). Cambridge: Cambridge University Press. ISBN 978-0-521-61636-2.

Shah Khalil Allah III of the Ahl al-Bayt Banu Hashim Clan of the Banu Quraish Born: 1740 C.E Died: 1817 C.E.
Shia Islam titles
Preceded by Abū-l-Ḥasan ‘Alī ibn Qāsim ‘Alī	45th Imam of Nizari Ismailism; 1792–1817	Succeeded by Hasan Ali Shah
