= Shams al-Din Muhammad (Nizari imam) =

Nizari Ismaili Shia Imam (1257–1310)

Shams al-Dīn Muḥammad

Imam of Nizari Isma'ilism
- Tenure: 1256–1310
- Predecessor: Rukn al-Din Khurshah
- Successor: Qasim Shah (Qasim-Shahi); Mu'min Shah (Mu'mini)
- Born: Before 1256
- Died: 1310

Shams al-Din Muhammad (Arabic: شمس الدین محمد, romanized: Shams al-Dīn Muḥammad; before 1256 – c. 1310) was the 28th imam of the Nizari Isma'ili community. Little is known about his life. He was the first imam to rule after the destruction of the Nizari state by the Mongol Empire, and spent his life hiding his true identity.

Following his death, the line of succession split into two, the Qasim-Shahi line, which survives to this day in the form of mainstream Nizari Isma'ilism, led by the Aga Khans, and the Muhammad-Shahi or Mu'mini line, which has diminished today to a few thousand followers in Syria.

== Life ==
His life is obscure, as few details are recorded about him. He was the youngest son of Rukn al-Din Khurshah, the last ruler of Alamut Castle, the centre of a Nizari Ismaili state until it was captured by the Mongol Empire in November 1256. Nizari tradition records that he had been designated (naṣṣ) as heir by his father, and brought to safety in the last months before the Mongol siege of Alamut and his father's surrender. The rest of his family were executed by the Mongols, leaving Shams al-Din the only survivor. With his father's execution, sometime in late spring 1257, Shams al-Din automatically succeeded him as imam.

He spent the rest of his life in Azerbaijan, in or around Tabriz. He kept his identity hidden, instead assuming the guise of a Sufi mystic (a common practice among the Nizaris at the time) and embroiderer, whence he is known traditionally by the nickname Zarduz. In Nizari tradition, Shams al-Din is sometimes confused with the earlier mystic Shams Tabrizi (1185–1248).

The fall of Alamut deprived the widespread Nizari movement of its centre, but Shams al-Din appears to have established contact with at least some Nizari groups. In his travelogue Safarnama, the contemporary Ismaili poet Nizari Quhistani alludes to have seen him in person in 1280, calling him by the names Shams-i Din Shah Nimruz Ali and Shah Shams. During his imamate, the Nizari community managed to regroup in Rudbar in northern Persia and even temporarily reoccupied Alamut, but the Syrian Nizaris fell under the sway of the Mamluk Sultanate.

== Death and succession disputes ==
Shams al-Din died c. 1310, inaugurating an obscure period in Nizari history that lasted until the late 15th century. The imams of the time are known as little less than names in lists of succession dating to much later periods, with few reliable dates or information about their lives. It is known however that after Shams al-Din's death, his oldest son, Ala al-Din Mu'min Shah, disputed the succession with the youngest, Qasim Shah. This split the Nizari imamate into two rival lines, the Qasim-Shahis, and the Mu'mini or Muhammad-Shahi line, although the schism itself is almost unmentioned in Nizari literature. The middle son, Kiya Shah, did not lay a similar claim.

The Mu'mini line, originally the more prominent of the two, has diminished today to a few thousand followers in Syria, while the Qasim-Shahi line has ended up representing most modern Nizaris, and is led today by the Aga Khans.

== Sources ==
- Daftary, Farhad (1997). "S̲h̲ams al-Dīn Muḥammad". In Bosworth, C. E.; van Donzel, E.; Heinrichs, W. P. & Lecomte, G. (eds.). The Encyclopaedia of Islam, Second Edition. Volume IX: San–Sze. Leiden: E. J. Brill. pp. 295–296. doi:10.1163/1573-3912_islam_SIM_6809. ISBN 978-90-04-10422-8.
- Daftary, Farhad (2007). The Ismāʿı̄lı̄s: Their History and Doctrines (Second ed.). Cambridge: Cambridge University Press. ISBN 978-0-521-61636-2.
- Daftary, Farhad (2015). "ŠAMS-AL-DIN MOḤAMMAD". In Yarshater, Ehsan (ed.). Encyclopædia Iranica (Online ed.). Encyclopædia Iranica Foundation.
- Virani, Shafique N. (2007). The Ismailis in the Middle Ages. A History of Survival, A Search for Salvation. Oxford and New York: Oxford University Press. ISBN 978-0-19-531173-0.

Shia Islam titles
Preceded by Rukn al-Din Khurshah	28th Imam of Nizari Isma'ilism; 1257–1310	Succeeded by Mu'min Shah as Mu'mini imam
Preceded by Rukn al-Din Khurshah	28th Imam of Nizari Isma'ilism; 1257–1310	Succeeded by Qasim Shah as Qasim-Shahi imam
