= Shah Nizar II =

40th imam of the Qasim-Shahi branch of the Nizari Isma'ili community (died 1722)

Shāh Nizār II (Persian: شاه نزار ثانی) was the 40th imam of the Qasim-Shahi branch of the Nizari Isma'ili community.

Shah Nizar II succeeded his father Khalil Allah II Ali when the latter died in 1680. At some point during the early part of his imamate, Shah Nizar left the village of Anjudan, where his predecessors had resided for over two centuries, and moved to the nearby village of Kahak, which became the new residence of the Nizari imams.

On his initiative, many Nizari faithful who until then had lived as nomads in Khurasan, came and settled in Kerman. Shah Nizar had close relations with the Sufi Ni'matullah Order, and in his role as a Sufi master (tariqa) adopted the name of Ata Allah, by which many of the Nizari followers in Kerman came to be known.

Shah Nizar died in September 1722, and was succeeded by his son, Sayyid Ali. Shah Nizar's mausoleum still survives in Kahak, but was heavily restored in 1966 losing many of its original 18th-century fixtures.

== Sources ==
- Daftary, Farhad (2007). The Ismāʿı̄lı̄s: Their History and Doctrines (Second ed.). Cambridge: Cambridge University Press. ISBN 978-0-521-61636-2.

Shah Nizar II of the Ahl al-Bayt Banu Hashim Clan of the Banu Quraish Born: ? C.E Died: 1722 C.E.
Regnal titles
Shia Islam titles
| Preceded by Khalil Allah II Ali | 40th Imam of Nizari Isma'ilism (Qasim-Shahi line); 1680–1722 | Succeeded by Sayyid Ali |
