= Sayyid Hasan Ali =

Nizari Isma'ili imam from 1754

Sayyid Ḥasan ʿAlī (Note: Full name: Sayyed Abu' 1- Hasan 'Ali Shah Mahallati Kohaki) (Arabic: سید حسن علي) or Seyyed Ḥasan Bēg (Persian: سید حسن بیگ) was the 42nd imam of the Qasim-Shahi branch of the Nizari Isma'ili community.

Sayyid Hasan Ali succeeded his father Sayyid Ali when the latter died in September 1754. While his predecessors resided at the obscure town of Kahak in central Persia, Sayyid Hasan Ali moved to Shahr-e Babak, apparently to spare his Khoja followers from India the arduous journey road to Kahak, during which they were exposed to Bakhtiari tribal attacks and extortion by local officials.

The money received from the tithes paid by the Khojas allowed Hasan Ali to acquire significant properties in Shahr-e Babak, as well as the provincial capital of Kerman, which became his winter residence. He was also the first Nizari imam in many years to appear publicly, and played an important role in local affairs. He was particularly close to the regional governor Shahrokh Khan Afshar, as indicated by the fact that his daughter married with Shahrokh's son Lutf Ali Khan.

Sayyid Hasan Ali was succeeded by his son, Qasim Ali.

== Sources ==
- Daftary, Farhad (2007). The Ismāʿı̄lı̄s: Their History and Doctrines (Second ed.). Cambridge: Cambridge University Press. ISBN 978-0-521-61636-2.

Shia Islam titles
Preceded by Sayyid Ali	42nd Imam of Nizari Isma'ilism (Qasim-Shahi line); 1754–unknown	Succeeded by Qasim Ali
