= Kahak, Delijan =

Village in Markazi province, Iran

Kahak Persian: كهك
- Village
- Location within Iran
- Coordinates: 34°10′52″N 50°20′01″E
- Country: Iran
- Province: Markazi
- County: Delijan
- District: Central
- Rural District: Do Dehak

Population (2016)
  - Total: 67
- Time zone: UTC+3:30 (IRST)

Kahak (Persian: كهك) (Note: Also romanized as Kohak) is a village in Do Dehak Rural District of the Central District in Delijan County, Markazi province, Iran.

== History ==
During Safavid times, the village enjoyed some importance, and was the site of a large caravanserai, now in ruins.

During the late medieval period, the village was the center of the Qasim-Shahi line of Nizari Isma'ili emams, which transferred its residence from nearby Anjudan to Kahak during the early emamate of Shah Nizar II (1680–1722). His mausoleum in the western end of the village survives to this day, although a restoration in 1966 destroyed many of its original elements and fixtures.

The Nizari emams abandoned Kahak for Kerman province in the mid-18th century, but Shah Khalil Allah III (1792–1817) re-established himself there shortly into his emamate until 1815, when he moved to Yazd. Kahak was the birthplace in 1804 of Shah Khalil Allah's son and successor, Aga Khan I.

== Demographics ==
=== Population ===
At the time of the 2006 National Census, the village's population was 116 in 40 households. The following census in 2011 counted 79 people in 34 households. The 2016 census measured the population of the village as 67 people in 32 households.
