= Aga Khan School =

Aga Khan School may refer to the following:

- Aga Khan Education Services, with more than 200 schools
  - Aga Khan School, Dhaka, Bangladesh
  - Aga Khan School, Osh, Kyrgyzstan
  - Aga Khan Lycée, Khorog, Tajikistan
  - Aga Khan Academies
    - Aga Khan Academy, Hyderabad, India
    - Aga Khan Academy, Nairobi, Kenya
    - Aga Khan Junior Academy, Nairobi, Kenya

== See also ==
- Aga Khan (disambiguation)
- Aga Khan Development Network
