= Aga Khan (disambiguation) =

Aga Khan may refer to:

- Aga Khan, the hereditary title of the Imam (spiritual and global leader) of the Ismaili Nizārī Muslims
  - Aga Khan I (1804–1881), the first Aga Khan, and 46th hereditary Imam
  - Aga Khan II (1830–1885), the second Aga Khan and 47th hereditary Imam
  - Aga Khan III (1877–1957), the third Aga Khan and 48th hereditary Imam
  - Aga Khan IV (1936–2025), the fourth Aga Khan and 49th hereditary Imam
  - Aga Khan V (2025–present), the fifth Aga Khan and 50th hereditary Imam

== Other people ==
- Prince Sadruddin Aga Khan (1933–2003), United Nations High Commissioner for Refugees from 1966 to 1978
- Yasmin Aga Khan (b. 1949), American philanthropist known for raising public awareness in Alzheimer's disease

== Other ==
- Aga Khan case, an 1866 court case in India regarding the authority of the Aga Khan
- Aga Khan Palace in Pune, India
- Aga Khan Prize (disambiguation)
- Aga Khan Trophy, annual equestrian showjumping award at the Dublin Horse Show, Ireland
- Aga Khan Development Network, whose subsidiaries include:
  - Aga Khan Foundation (AKF)
  - Aga Khan Health Services (AKHS)
    - Aga Khan Hospital (disambiguation), any of eight medical institutions around the world, run by AKHS
  - Aga Khan Agency for Microfinance (AKAM)
  - Aga Khan Fund for Economic Development (AKFED)
  - Aga Khan Planning and Building Services (AKPBS)
  - Focus Humanitarian Assistance (FOCUS)
  - Aga Khan School (disambiguation)
    - Aga Khan Education Services (AKES)
  - Aga Khan University (AKU), Pakistan's first private, autonomous university
  - University of Central Asia (UCA)
  - Aga Khan Trust for Culture (AKTC)
    - Aga Khan Award for Architecture (AKAA), an architectural award established by the Aga Khan in 1977
