= Aga Khan Hospital, Dar es Salaam =

Aga Khan Hospital Dar es Salaam
- Aga Khan Health Services
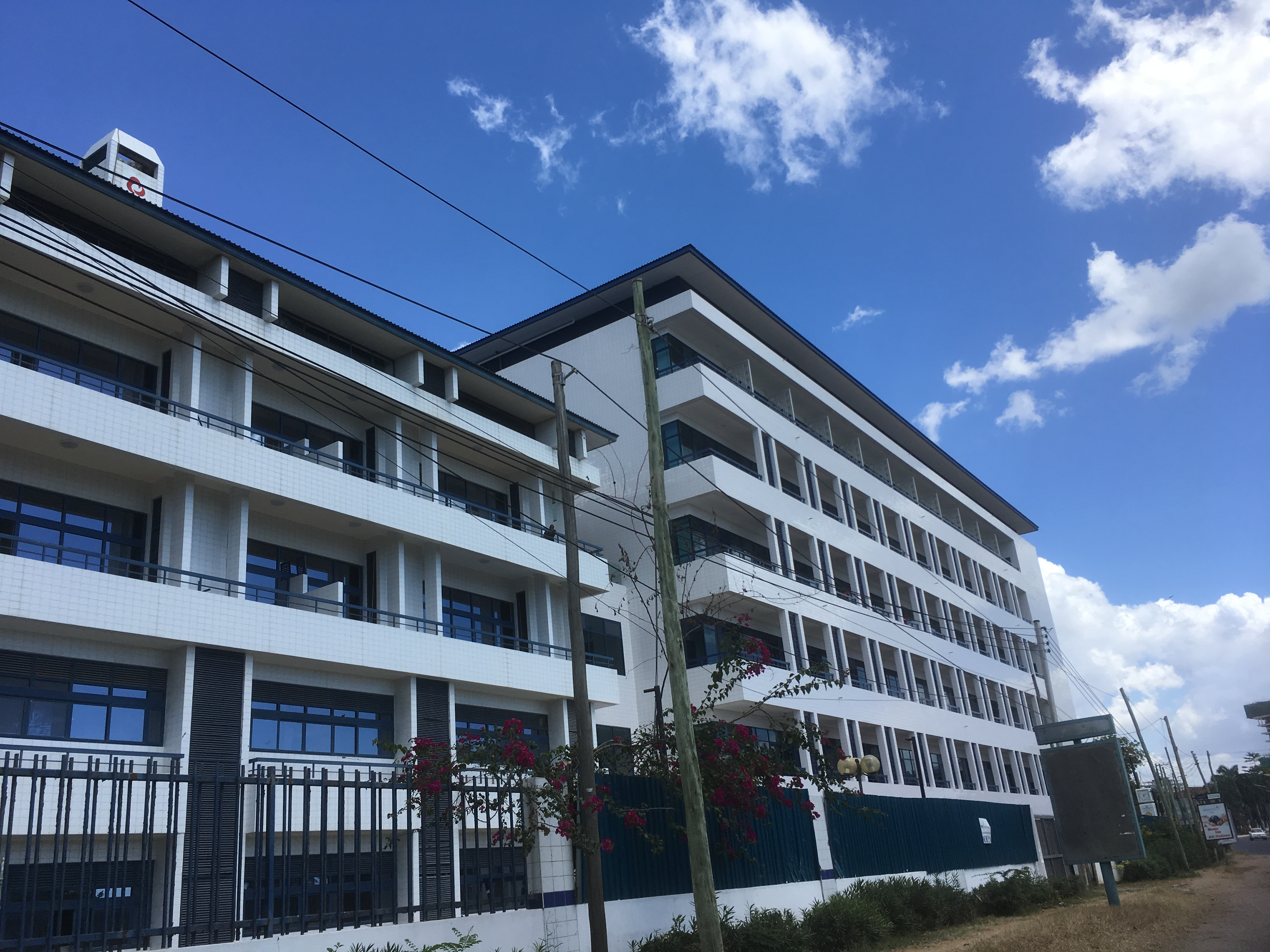

Geography
- Location: Dar es Salaam, Tanzania
- Coordinates: 6.803487°S 39.287841°E

Organisation
- Care system: Private
- Type: Teaching
- Affiliated university: Aga Khan University

Services
- Standards: ISO 9001: 2000; JCI
- Emergency department: Yes
- Beds: 170

History
- Founded: 1964

Links
- Website: www.agakhanhospitals.org/dar/
- Lists: Hospitals in Tanzania
- Other links: List of Aga Khan Hospitals

Established in 1964, the Aga Khan Hospital, Dar es Salaam is a 170-bed multispecialty hospital. The hospital provides general medical services, specialist clinics and diagnostic services. It serves as a hub for several clinics around the city. It is also part of the Aga Khan Health Services international referral system, with links to the Aga Khan Hospital, Nairobi and the Aga Khan University Hospital, Karachi.

== Facilities ==
The hospital's services include a 15-bed intensive care unit for adult, cardiac and paediatric populations, a haemodialysis unit, an interventional cardiology unit, six operating theatres, a neurophysiology unit, general wards for all major subspecialities, a radiology service that includes general radiology, MRI, CT and 3D mammography and a 24/7 emergency department.

The hospital launched its Cancer Care Centre in January 2020, which will serve as a key hub for the Tanzania Comprehensive Cancer Project. It is expected to be completed in 2024.

== Education ==
The hospital, under the umbrella of the Aga Khan University offers residency programmes in Family Medicine, Internal Medicine and Surgery.

== Accreditation ==
In 2016, AKH received Joint Commission International (JCI) accreditation, making it the only JCI accredited hospital in the country, and the second in East Africa, after the Aga Khan University Hospital, Nairobi.

== See also ==
- Aga Khan Development Network
- Muhimbili National Hospital in Dar es Salaam
- Aga Khan University Hospital, Karachi Pakistan
