= Aga Khan Hospital for Women =

Maternity hospital in Karachi

The Aga Khan Hospital for Women Karimabad
- Aga Khan Health Services

Geography
- Location: Karimabad, Karachi, Sindh, Pakistan
- Coordinates: 24.9263°N 67.0644°E

Organisation
- Care system: Private
- Type: Specialist
- Affiliated university: The Aga Khan University Hospital, Karachi

Services
- Standards: ISO 9001: 2000
- Beds: 41
- Speciality: Maternity services

History
- Founded: 1979

Links
- Website: www.agakhanhospitals.org/karimabad/
- Lists: Hospitals in Pakistan
- Other links: List of Aga Khan Hospitals

Originally established as a Maternity Home in 1979, the Aga Khan Hospital for Women, Karimabad is a 41-bed maternity facility offering health care. Located on the premises, the Aga Khan Diagnostic and Day Surgery Centre, Karimabad complements the hospital with diagnostic and surgical services. They are part of the Aga Khan Health Services international referral system with links to the Aga Khan University Hospital, Karachi.

== See also ==
- Aga Khan Development Network
