= Aga Khan Hospital, Mombasa =

Coordinates: 4°04′13″S 39°40′14″E

Aga Khan Hospital Mombasa
- Aga Khan Health Services

Geography
- Location: Mombasa, Kenya

Organisation
- Care system: Private
- Type: General
- Affiliated university: Aga Khan University Hospital, Nairobi and Aga Khan University Hospital, Karachi

Services
- Standards: ISO 9001:2000
- Beds: 115

History
- Founded: 1944

Links
- Website: http://www.agakhanhospitals.org/mombasa/
- Lists: Hospitals in Kenya
- Other links: List of Aga Khan Hospitals

Established in 1944, the Aga Khan Hospital, in Mombasa Kenya, is part of the Aga Khan Health Services (AKHS). It is a 96-bed acute care facility offering health care. The hospital provides general medical services, specialist clinics and high-tech diagnostic services. It is part of the Aga Khan Health Services international referral system with links to the Aga Khan University Hospital, Nairobi and Aga Khan University Hospital, Karachi.

In January 2017, The Aga Khan Health Services-Kenya and Agence Française de Développement (AFD) signed a $12.5 million upgrading and expansion agreement for Mombasa Aga Khan and Kisumu hospitals. The expansion will include a development of day-care chemotherapy centre and a cardiology programme.

== See also ==
- Aga Khan Development Network
