= Akah =

Akah may refer to:

- Long Akah, settlement in Malaysia
- Emmanuel Akah (born 1979), English-American footballer
- Aga Khan Academy, Hyderabad, a full International Baccalaureate school in Hyderabad
- Aga Khan Agency for Habitat, umbrella of AKDN agencies and programs that provides aid and delivers training on habitat and disaster preparedness
