= Building and Construction Improvement Program =

Pakistani

The Building and Construction Improvement Program (BACIP) is a program of the Aga Khan Planning and Building Service, Pakistan (AKPBS,P) that is engaged in developing and promoting solutions to housing and built environment-related issues of rural communities living in Gilgit-Baltistan and the province of Sindh.

Since 1997, BACIP has benefited over 150,000 people from the installation of over 36,000 smokeless stoves, water-warming facilities, and other energy-efficient products. The program has trained over 6,400 construction craftsmen and entrepreneurs.

== Program overview ==
Poor villages in the northern regions of Pakistan experience problems related to housing and living conditions. Some of the core problems are:

- Cold, dark, damp, dusty and unhygienic in-house environment;
- Poor and weak structures of the houses which required maintenance and which were susceptible to damage during earthquake, hence putting life and property at risk;
- Lack of proper sanitation;
- High expenses and workload related to fuel wood collection and purchase;
- High degree of smoke and pollution inside the houses;
- Heavy workload of women to complete household chores;
- High incidence of environment related diseases like ARI, pneumonia, eye soreness, etc.;
- Overall demoralizing living conditions which led to a feeling of utter poverty and hopelessness.

In general, over 15% of the household expenditure and around 50% of disease morbidity in the region were directly attributable to poor housing conditions, most of which were avoidable. Keeping these issues in view, the Building and Construction Improvement Program (BACIP) set out to improve the living condition by developing several home–improvement products that mitigated the negative impact of planning and building inefficiencies on these traditional households and lessened the burden on the surrounding environment. BACIP also attempted to reduce the cost and increase the affordability of better housing conditions.

BACIP works to improve the built environment by focusing on a participatory approach. This means that the program team works with the local people to develop products that can address housing issues such as fuel-efficient stoves, water warming facilities, solar cookers and geysers, roof hatch windows and more. AKPBS,P can market these products through village resource people. This provides income-earning opportunities for the locals while promoting products that can greatly improve the quality of their lives.

== Program impact ==
Studies have shown significant impact of BACIP products on poverty alleviation, environment conservation, health improvement, and seismic vulnerability reduction. Since most of the household chores (collection of firewood, dusting, and minor house repairs) are undertaken by females, BACIP impacts gender issues at the strategic level.

In 2003, BACIP partnered with the First MicroFinance Bank, an institution of the Aga Khan Agency for Microfinance, to provide micro-credit facilities to homeowners for the purchase of BACIP products. This unique program was one of the first initiatives in Pakistan geared toward relatively small investments that increased the accessibility of BACIP in the target area.

To date BACIP has achieved the following results:

- More than 18,000 households and approximately 150,000 people have benefited from one or more of the 36,067 BACIP products over 10 years.
- More than 9,500 cooking stoves including 8,900 water-warming facilities; 8,600 floor insulations; 1,500 roof hatch windows; and 7,600 other value-added products were sold by the end of 2008.
- BACIP products reduce domestic biomass consumption — which accounts for 85% of for overall wood consumption in the program area — by 15-60%
- It was reported that BACIP stoves reduce smoke related diseases — which account for around 35% of acute diseases in the program area — by as much as 60%.
- BACIP has trained 6411 construction craftsmen, product manufacturers and entrepreneurs/salespersons.

== Awards ==
=== Ashden Awards, 2011 ===
On June 16, 2011 the world's most prestigious green energy awards announced that the Aga Khan Planning and Building Service's (AKPBS) innovative Building and Construction Improvement Program (BACIP) has received the Award for Avoided Deforestation at the Ashden Awards for Sustainable Energy. Princess Zahra, head of the Social Welfare department of the Aga Khan Development Network, accepted the award on behalf of AKPBS at a ceremony in London addressed by Rt. Hon. Gregory Barker, UK Government Minister for Climate Change. Winners from India and Africa were also announced.

=== Global Leadership Award, 2009 ===
BACIP won the Partnership for Clean Indoor Air (PCIA) Global Leadership Award, 2009 for its achievements in improving health, livelihood, and quality of life, particularly of women and children, by reducing exposure to indoor air pollution from household energy use.

=== Energy Globe Award for Pakistan, 2008 ===
BACIP was awarded the national Energy Globe Award for Pakistan for its efforts to introduce energy efficient products in rural communities that are heavily dependent on natural resources for their domestic energy requirements. The award was presented to the Aga Khan Planning and Building Service, Pakistan at a ceremony held in Prague.

=== World Habitat Award, 2006 ===
BACIP won the World Habitat Award for 2006 for its efforts to improve housing conditions in Pakistan.

=== Alcan Prize for Sustainability, 2005 ===
In 2005, the Aga Khan Planning and Building Service received the US$1 million Alcan Prize for Sustainability for its efforts to provide water and sanitation facilities as well as improve housing conditions through the Building and Construction Improvement Program (BACIP) in Pakistan.

== See also ==
- Aga Khan Development Network
- Aga Khan Planning and Building Services
- Water and Sanitation Extension Program
