= Aga Khan Hospital, Kisumu =

Aga Khan Hospital Kisumu
- Aga Khan Health Services

Geography
- Location: Kisumu, Kisumu County, former Nyanza Province, Kenya
- Coordinates: 0°05′55″S 34°45′22″E

Organisation
- Care system: Private
- Type: General
- Affiliated university: Aga Khan University Hospital, Nairobi and Aga Khan University Hospital, Karachi

Services
- Standards: ISO 9001:2000, Ministry of Health Level 5
- Beds: 76

History
- Founded: 1952

Links
- Website: www.agakhanhospitals.org/kisumu
- Lists: Hospitals in Kenya

Established in 1952, the Aga Khan Hospital in Kisumu is a 76-bed acute care facility. The hospital provides general medicine services, specialist clinics and high-tech diagnostic services and has an emergency Casualty Department. It is part of the Aga Khan Health Services international referral system with links to Aga Khan University Hospital, Nairobi and Aga Khan University Hospital, Karachi.

== History ==
The foundation for the Aga Khan Dispensary and Maternity Home was laid on 26 February 1951, by Prince Aly Khan, and the facility opened in 1952 as an 8-bed general ward.

In 1960, the dispensary was extended to incorporate two general wards with a total of 17 beds and an outpatient department. A small laboratory was established in 1975 and a portable X-ray machine purchased. By 1979, the average bed occupancy was over 100 percent, which indicated a need for expansion.

In 1991, the hospital had 55 beds, piped oxygen gas was available, an administration block was completed and physiotherapy services were introduced. By 1992 the bed capacity had increased to 76 with a paediatric ward, a VIP wing and an acute care unit.

== See also ==
- Aga Khan Development Network
