= Prince Aly Khan Hospital =

Prince Aly Khan Hospital Mumbai
- Aga Khan Health Services

Geography
- Location: Mumbai, Maharashtra, India

Organisation
- Care system: Private
- Type: General

Services
- Standards: ISO 9001:2000
- Beds: 162

History
- Founded: 1945

Links
- Website: http://www.agakhanhospitals.org/mumbai/
- Lists: Hospitals in India
- Other links: List of Aga Khan Hospitals

Established in 1945, the Prince Aly Khan Hospital is a 162-bed multispecialty acute care hospital in Mumbai. The ISO-certified hospital is best known for its services in oncology and cardiovascular disease, and a referral centre. The hospital is equipped with an operating complex, oncology department, cardiology department, 24-hour emergency service and a day surgery unit. It has sophisticated intensive care, renal dialysis, neonatal, paediatric and general intensive care units, a centre for gastrointestinal diseases and other facilities. Outpatient services, including free visits for the poor, are provided.

== See also ==
- Aga Khan Development Network
