= Aga Khan Secondary Hospital, Kharadar =

Hospital in Karachi

Geography
- Location: Karachi, Sindh, Pakistan, Pakistan
- Coordinates: 24°51′17″N 66°59′46″E

Organisation
- Care system: Public
- Affiliated university: Aga Khan University
- Patron: Aga Khan Health Services

History
- Opened: 1924

Links
- Website: hospitals.aku.edu/pakistan/Kharadar/Pages/default.aspx
- Lists: Hospitals in Pakistan

The Aga Khan Secondary Hospital, Kharadar (AKHW&C), also known as Aga Khan Hospital for Women and Children, Kharadar, formerly known as Janbai Maternity Home, is a non-profit hospital in Karachi, Pakistan. It is one of the oldest hospital in Karachi.

== History ==
It was established in 1924 as Janbai Maternity Home by Ismaili philanthropists, Sir Sultan Muhammad Shah Aga Khan III and Vazir Bundeh Ali Kassim. It was named after Jan Bai Kassim as Janbai Kassim Vali Khoja Ismailia Maternity Home.

In 2010, it was merged with the Aga Khan University Hospital (AKUH) to provide healthcare to diverse Karachi communities.

Situated in historic premises near Karachi port in a densely populated part of old Karachi, the hospital spans two campuses divided by a road. The Janbai Building houses general wards, private rooms, operating theaters, diagnostics, and pharmacy for inpatients, while the Aga Khan Diagnostic Centre accommodates clinics, laboratory, and diagnostics for outpatients.
