= Aga Khan Hospital =

Aga Khan Hospital may refer to:

- Aga Khan Hospital, Dar es Salaam
- Aga Khan Maternal and Child Care Centre, Hyderabad
- Aga Khan Hospital for Women, Karimabad
- Aga Khan Hospital, Kisumu
- Aga Khan Hospital, Mombasa
- Aga Khan University Hospital, Karachi
- Aga Khan University Hospital, Nairobi
- Aga Khan University Hospital, Kampala

== See also ==
- Aga Khan Development Network
- Aga Khan Health Services
- Aga Khan University
