= Aga Khan School, Dhaka =

The Aga Khan School, Dhaka

Location
- Primary section: Road # 9, Sector # 4 Junior section: Road # 6, Sector # 4 Senior section: Road # 6A, Sector # 4 Uttara, Dhaka, 1230; Bangladesh; 23°51′38.41″N 90°24′08.08″E (senior building)

Information
- Type: Private
- Established: 1988
- School district: Dhaka
- Head of Education: Dr. Dale Taylor
- Faculty: 67 (2013)
- Grades: 12
- Enrollment: 1,222 (2013)
- Website: www.agakhanschools.org/Bangladesh/AKSD

The Aga Khan School, Dhaka, is an English Medium School, in Uttara, Dhaka under the Aga Khan Development Network (AKDN) and the Aga Khan Education Service, Bangladesh. It is one of the earliest private English Medium schools in Bangladesh founded in 1988, in a small campus in Siddeshwari, Dhaka. Dr. Dale Taylor is the current Head of Education.

== History ==
The Aga Khan School, Dhaka was formed back in 1988, in the library of the Ismaili Tariqah and Religious Education Board (ITREB), an institution of the Aga Khan Education Service, Bangladesh. The foundations of the present system were laid by Sir Sultan Mohamed Shah, Aga Khan III, who established over 200 schools during the first half of the 20th century, the first of them in 1905 in Zanzibar, Gwadur in Pakistan and Mundra in India. Since the creation of Aga Khan Education Service companies in the 1970s, the schools have been administered and managed centrally. The school started with 25 students and 7 teaching staff, occupying classes IX to XII.

In August of 1990, the present senior section opened in Uttara. The junior and primary sections were opened in 1999 and 2000 respectively.

The school was authorized as an International Baccalaureate World School in April 2009.

In 2009, the longest serving Head of Education, George G. Kays, retired, serving the school from July 1998 to June 2009. Jacqueline Parai served as the Head of the School from 2009 to 2011.

Dr. Dale Taylor is the current Head of Education.

== Description ==
As of 2013, the school consists of a student body of 1,222 and a faculty of 118 teachers. The school offers education from preschool to higher secondary levels (playgroup, nursery, kindergarten I and II and grades 1 to 12), following the National Curriculum for England, designed to prepare students for IGCSE and GCE Advanced Level examinations.

Fahmida Chowdhury is serving as Head of Secondary School, while Shatila Reza is serving as Head of Middle School. The chairman of the board is Mr. Suleiman Ajanee. The school organizes annual events, functions and concerts. Annually, the Ordinary and Advanced Level examinees of Aga Khan School perform impressively in the exams, as evidenced by their presence at The Daily Star Awards for schools following the Cambridge International Examinations.

== International Baccalaureate certification ==
The school has been an IB World School since April 2009. It offers the IB Primary Years Program in English. Additionally, the school is moving to the complete IB Curriculum, which will be conducted at new premises at Bashundhara, Dhaka. The institute offering the IB program will be named The Aga Khan Academy.

The proposed Aga Khan Academy has been in the planning stages for several years, and the Aga Khan Education Service, Bangladesh (AKES,B) have obtained pre-authorization from the International Baccalaureate Organization (IBO) to implement the IB Primary Years Programme (IB-PYP) in pre-school (Play Group and Nursery), Kindergarten and Grades 1 to 5.

His Highness Prince Karim Aga Khan IV, on his visit to Bangladesh, laid the foundation stone for the Aga Khan Academy in Basundhara, Dhaka. This will be a full-fledged IBO authorized school offering the Primary Years Program (PYP), the Middle Years Program (MYP) for Grades 6 to 10, and the Diploma Program (IB-DP) for students in Grades 11 and 12. However, little construction has been completed.

The academy will have International Academic Partnership (IAP) agreements with Phillips Academy in Andover, Massachusetts, United States and Schule Schloss Salem in Salem, Baden-Württemberg, Germany.

== Reflections (The Aga Khan Yearbook) ==
Reflections, the AKSD Yearbook, has been a strong tradition for 30 years, since its inception in 1995 and its last ever yearbook, published in 2024. The Yearbook is created by the Yearbook Committee, a group formed by students who perform every task to get the book published from scratch. The following is a list of the books, and their corresponding lead editors.

Year	Name	Lead Editors
1995	REFLECTIONS	Shafat Zaman, Hasan Munasir, Tazin Abdullah
1996	REFLECTIONS '96	Mumtad Choudhury, Ju-un Choudhury
1997	REFLECTIONS '97	Mashfiq Ul Haque
1998	89' ƧИOITƆƎ⅃ꟻƎЯ	Fuad Abdullah, Nazmul Alam, Ahad Hussain
1999	REFLECTIONS ‘99	Amir Sattar, Sama Khan, Samin Abdullah
2000	REFLECTIONS 2000	Faria Tazin Rahman, Sabeer Zaman
2003	REFLECTIONS 2002-03	Munir Susan, Shoeb Sonia, Ibrahim Mohammad
2004	REFLECTIONS 2003-04	Tahsin Mahmood, Karina Z. Khandakar
2007	REFLECTIONS 2004-07	Rashid Mustafa, Bidoura Mosharraf, Naushin Ahmed
2008	REFLECTIONS 2007-08	Faiyaz Amit, Sharina Muzahid
2009	REFLECTIONS 2008-09	Wasi Mesbahuddin, Naushin Ahmed, Ridwan Faruq, Ahnaf Habib Khan
2012	REFLECTIONS 2009-12	Hassan Ferdous, Saad Bin Reza, Fahria Tasneem, Tushar Ahmed
2014	REFLECTIONS 2013-14	Saadman Islam, Mujaheed Khan
2016	REFLECTIONS 2015-16	Anisha Islam, Naiyara Ahscan.
2017	REFLECTIONS 2016-17	Prionzita Chakraborty, Afrida Nawal, Senjuti Basak
2018	REFLECTIONS 2017-18	Drubha Nil Ghosh, Tousif Islam, Bushratun Nusaibah
2019	REFLECTIONS 2018-19	Fabia Masud, Farazi Fayezuddin, Bushratun Nusaibah, Tousif Islam
2020	REFLECTIONS 2019-20	Nabiha Mahmud, Smiti Modhurima
2024	REFLECTIONS 2023-34	Syed Rohan Hoque, Tahsin Shabab Khan

== List of Heads of Education ==
Tenure	Nationality	Name
1988–1991	(Bangladesh)	Mohiuddin Babar (acting)
1991–1994	(Canada)	Zul Khuja
1994–1997	(Canada)	Kenneth McCaffery
1997–2009	(Canada)	George Gaddon Kays
2010–2011	(Canada)	Jacqueline Parai
2011–2014	(Australia)	Nicola Sum
2015 —2017	(Bangladesh)	Fatima J. Husein
2017 – November 2018	(Australia)	Craig Salmon
2019–2021	(Canada)	Dr. Dale Taylor

== School Leadership Team ==
As of Oct 2017, the School Leadership Team consists of:

	Primary School	Secondary School
Principal	Dr. Dale Taylor	
Heads	Shatila Reza	Late Fahmida Chowdhury
Coordinators	Latifa Rahman; Tanjina Hossain; Syeda Syeda Mobasshera Sultana; SM Fouzia Akhter Khan	Md. Mahmudul Hasan; Shemoul Hamid; Shamima Shahnaz; Usha Kasana
Operations Manager	Major Waliur Rahman	
IT Manager	Faruk Sikder (Acting)	
Finance Officer	Karim Nathu	

== See also ==
- Aga Khan Education Services
- Aga Khan Development Network
- Aga Khan Academies
