= Aga Khan Junior Academy, Nairobi =

Aga Khan Junior Academy Nairobi

Location
- Nairobi; Kenya
- Coordinates: 1.266004°S 36.822705°E

Information
- Type: Private; Primary
- Established: 1970 (56 years ago)
- Enrollment: 300
- Affiliation: Aga Khan Education Services
- Website: www.agakhanschools.org

The Aga Khan Junior Academy, Nairobi, is situated in the suburb of Parklands neighborhood of Nairobi, Kenya.

== History and operations ==
Established in 1970, the school accommodates about 300 students from international and multi-cultural backgrounds. It is open to all races, religions and nationalities and is part of the Aga Khan Education Service, Kenya (AKES, K).

The Aga Khan Junior Academy offers the Primary Years Programme of the International Baccalaureate.

The school faculty is multi-cultural and international. All teaching staff hold at least a graduate degree.

== See also ==
- Aga Khan Academy, Nairobi
- Aga Khan Development Network
- Education in Kenya
- List of schools in Kenya
