= Mountain Societies Development Support Programme =

Development programme in Kyrgyzstan

The Mountain Societies Development Support Programme is a branch of the Aga Khan Development Network ("AKDN") dedicated to improving the quality of life of the people of the mountainous oblasts of Tajikistan and Kyrgyzstan.
