= Zahra Aga Khan =

Swiss princess (born 1970)

Princess Zahra Aga Khan
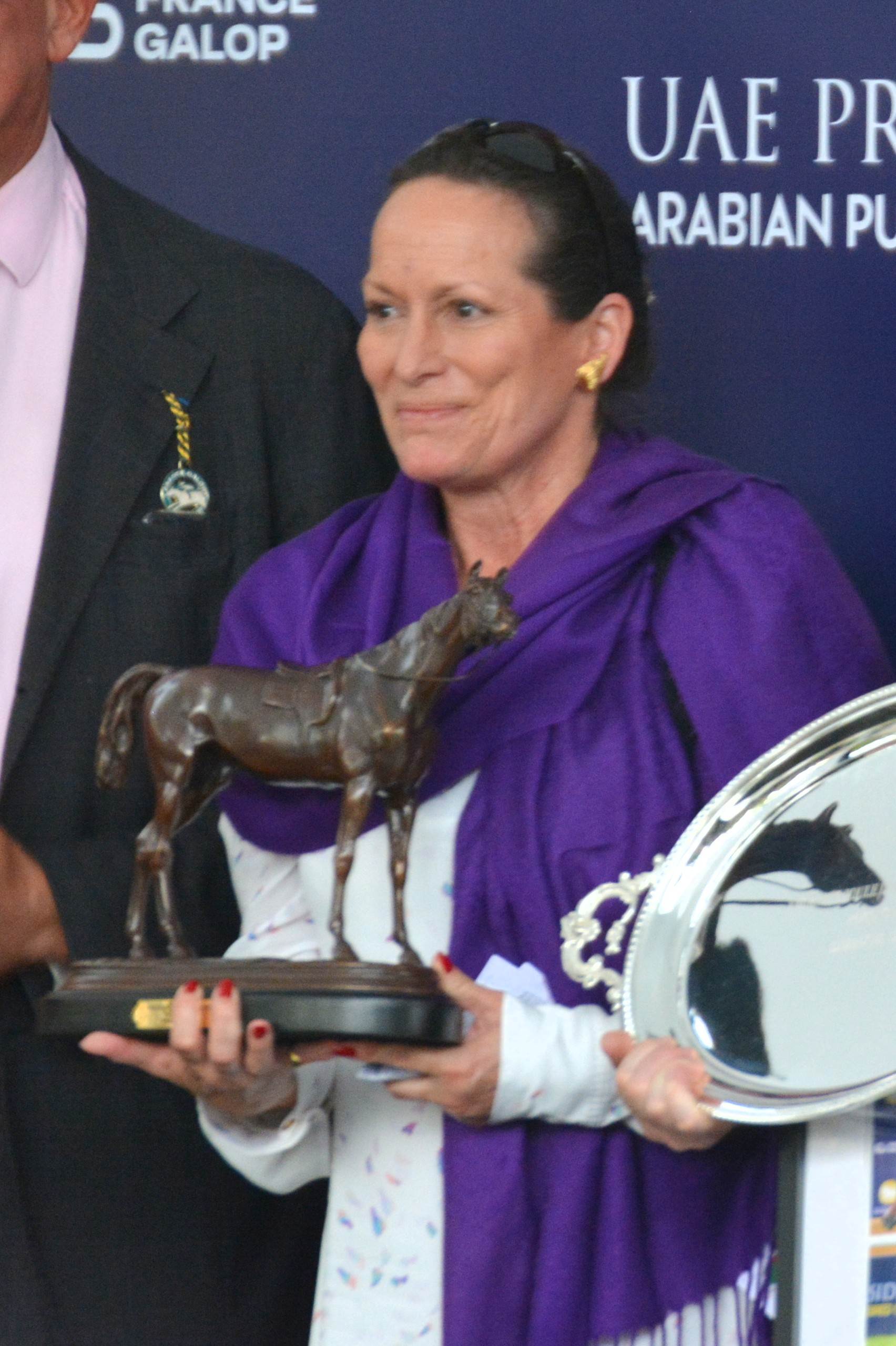
- Zahra Aga Khan in 2024
- Born: 18 September 1970 (age 56); Geneva, Switzerland
- Spouse: Mark Boyden (m. 1997; div. 2005)
- Issue: Sara Boyden; Iliyan Boyden
- House: Noorani
- Father: Aga Khan IV
- Mother: Salimah Aga Khan
- Religion: Nizari Ismaili Shia Islam
- Occupation: Philanthropist

Princess Zahra Aga Khan (born 18 September 1970) is the eldest child of Karim al-Husseini (also known as Aga Khan IV) and Salimah Aga Khan.

== Education ==
Zahra attended Le Rosey School in Switzerland and received her undergraduate degree cum laude in Development Studies from Harvard University (AB’94). She also completed a four-month program at Massachusetts General Hospital to enhance her understanding of healthcare systems and the delivery of advanced medical care, and an Executive Finance course at IMD in Lausanne.

== Career ==
Zahra is a member of the Board of Directors of the Aga Khan Development Network (AKDN) and also sits on the board of several of its affiliated structures, including the Aga Khan Foundation, the Aga Khan Trust for Culture, the Aga Khan Agency for Habitat, the Aga Khan Agency for Microfinance and the Aga Khan Schools.

She has policy and management responsibility for the Health, Education, and Planning and Building Services Companies of the AKDN and their institutions.

== Personal life ==
She married British businessman and former model Mark Boyden, an Anglican, in a civil ceremony on 21 June 1997. The wedding was held at the Château de Chantilly near Paris, in the presence of guests including King Juan Carlos and Queen Sofía of Spain, and Prince Hassan bin Talal of Jordan. The couple divorced in 2005.

Zahra and Mark Boyden have two children.

Like her father, Zahra is a fan of thoroughbred racing and has begun racing horses in her own name, the owner-breeder of the Prix Vermeille winner Mandesha. She was invited to ride in the King's procession at Royal Ascot 2023. Her horse Daryz won the Prix de l'Arc de Triomphe twice at l'Hippodrome de ParisLongchamp in 2025 and 2026. Her other horse, Calandagan, became the first internationally bred and trained horse in 20 years to win the Japan Cup at Tokyo Racecourse on November 30th 2025.

== Governance & leadership ==
- Zahra, the longest-serving member of AKU’s Board of Trustees, was appointed University’s Pro-Chancellor by the Chancellor Rahim Aga Khan V, to serve and act on his behalf
- Zahra is one the founding trustees of the University of Central Asia (UCA) since 2017 and engaged in the University’s governance and strategic direction.
- Zahra is on the Centre's Board of Directors of the Global Centre for Pluralism, and sits in the France Galop Committee.
- Zahra is the President of the Consiglio Direttivo of Yacht Club Costa Smeralda.

== Titles and honours ==
The titles Prince and Princess are claimed by the Aga Khans and their children by virtue of their descent from Shah Fath Ali Shah of the Persian Qajar dynasty. The title was officially recognised by the British government in 1938.

=== Honours ===
- USA:
  - Texas:On October 10, 2019, the Roy M. Huffington Award was presented to Zahra by the Asia Society Texas Center. The Award recognizes leaders who have been a major force on the international stage.
- Kenya:
  - Elder of the Order of the Golden Heart of Kenya (E.G.H.), 8 March 2025)

- Uganda:
  - Excellent Order of the Pearl of Africa (Grand Commander) (E.O.P.A.), 11 September 2025)

=== Honorary degrees ===
- Canada
  - Honorary LL.D. degree, Concordia University (2025)
