= Water and Sanitation Extension Program =

The Water and Sanitation Extension Program (WASEP) is an initiative by the Aga Khan Planning and Building Service, Pakistan to provide clean drinking water and hygienic sanitation facilities to prevent the high incidence of waterborne diseases in disadvantaged communities of Pakistan.

WASEP was launched in 1997 and has to date provided potable water and installed over 9200 latrines in 225 villages, benefiting over 165,000 people in the Northern Areas of Pakistan and the province of Sindh. An independent evaluation estimated the attributable reduction in diarrhea incidence at approximately 25%.

A report based on this evaluation was selected as lead scientific article for the peer-reviewed Bulletin of the World Health Organization. Although this estimate (25%) is lower than the 50-60% reduction projected by WASEP on the basis of pre-post intervention comparisons using program monitoring data, it is based on a rigorously designed case-control study that adjusted for confounding variables using advanced statistical methods. The attributable reduction compares favorably with other initiatives of this type when subjected to this level of rigor. The study has been cited in scientific reviews and in a public health textbook which states that "safe local water supply systems, properly managed and regularly tested by trained individuals, is a major development thrust in many parts of the world; interventions to improve hygiene education and practices show promise".

== Program overview ==
In Pakistan, like many countries of the developing world, inadequate quality and coverage of water and sanitation infrastructure is a major issue and is duly reflected in its poor basic health indicators:

- Infant mortality is approximately 80 per 1000 live births
- Mortality rate for children under five is 60 per 1000 live births
- 45% of infant and child mortality is due to diarrhea
- 30% of reported illnesses and 40% of deaths in Pakistan are attributed to waterborne diseases

Additionally, large amounts of women's labor and household expenditure are needed to meet high domestic water requirements. Women in rural parts of Pakistan are typically responsible for fetching water for their family needs. Spending a large part of their day on this basic chore prevents them from possible opportunities for income generation, education, and taking better care of their family.

== WASEP’s integrated approach ==
To design, provide and then maintain sustainable water and sanitation services requires the development of local capacity. WASEP provides communities with engineering and construction training and services, non-local materials, skilled labor, and health and hygiene education. Partner villages provide local materials, unskilled labor and operation and maintenance funds, which account for over 45% of the total costs. Both male and female villagers are involved at all stages of the intervention, to ensure that they are motivated to independently take ownership of completed projects.

All in all, WASEP’s integrated intervention package consists of:

=== Community Mobilization and Participation ===
WASEP trains partner villages to take ownership of all aspects of the intervention including water supply, sanitation, drainage, operation, maintenance and health and hygiene education. Responsibility for a scheme is entrusted to a village Water and Sanitation Committee and beneficiaries pay tariffs to cover the operations and maintenance costs. WASEP’s design process is participatory: involving communities, particularly women, at all stages of the intervention.

=== Water Quality Management ===
A key objective of WASEP is to provide potable water to meet World Health Organization standards. WASEP most often sources water from natural mountain springs or water channels of the Indus River requiring installation of village-level filtration plants. The system is easy to operate and does not require electricity, making it ideal for rural settings. The plant design is the result of extensive research and helps mitigate the high level of turbidity and micro-biological contamination experienced in many of the target areas.

=== Potable Water Supply ===
After source testing, water is collected and piped through high-density polyethylene pipes to a storage reservoir, and then onwards into the village where each home or cluster of homes is provided with a tap-stand providing 45-70 liters of water per capita per day. Responsible water use and management is promoted in areas where supply is limited through village education sessions. Communities contribute to the construction of the water supply scheme by providing local material and unskilled labor free of cost to the program. WASEP ensures that water is potable at all points in the supply chain.

=== Gray Water Drainage ===
WASEP installs infrastructure for the disposal of dirty (gray) and excess (spillover) water at each tap-stand, comprising cemented platforms with a drain, leading to either a soakage pit or an existing overland channel, where it is diluted before re-entering the =water supply.

=== Household Sanitation Infrastructure ===
Hygienic sanitation facility plays an important role in WASEP’s intervention. Following a comprehensive and objective information session on the options available, communities choose the sanitation technology of their preference. Three basic types are available to communities to meet different cultural preference for latrine facilities. Households are motivated to construct the latrine themselves and are provided technical assistance and construction advice to build efficiently.

=== Health and Hygiene Education ===
To focus on health and hygiene awareness WASEP has initiated a Community and School Health Improvement Program through which household and schools visits are made every two months. This program addresses topics such as diarrhea, worms, personal hygiene and operation, and maintenance of water scheme. Additionally, at each visit, health and hygiene promoters monitor progressive changes in the health and hygiene related behavior of each household.

== Addressing the MDGs ==
=== Ensure environmental sustainability ===
WASEP is providing sustainable access to safe drinking water in combination with capacity building and raising awareness at all levels. WASEP is able to “integrate the principles of sustainable development into country policies and programs.”

=== Combat HIV/AIDS, malaria and other diseases ===
By targeting water borne diseases and illnesses. WASEP is striving to “halt and be able to reverse the incidence of malaria and other major diseases.”

=== Reduce child mortality ===
45% of cases of infant and child mortality in Pakistan are a result of water-borne diseases. WASEP is working to “reduce by two thirds the mortality rate among children under five.”

=== Promote gender equality and empowering women ===
By insisting on equal male and female participation in its schemes, WASEP is able to break traditional gender barriers as a first step towards empowerment, giving women a greater voice in their homes and communities.

== Awards ==
=== National Energy Globe Award and Nominee for Water Category Award, 2009 ===
WASEP was awarded the National Award for Pakistan by Energy Globe 2009. WASEP was also shortlisted in the top three projects worldwide for the Water Category Award for its sustainable, environmentally friendly and efficient supply of safe water, low-cost sanitation facilities and health & hygiene education in many marginalized parts of Northern Pakistan.

=== Dubai International Award for Best Practices, 2008 ===
WASEP was awarded the Dubai International Award for Best Practices to Improve the Living Environment (DIABP) 2008 for its tangible impact resulting from the transfer of sustainable and life-improving ideas, skills, knowledge and technology.

=== Alcan Prize for Sustainability, 2005 ===
In 2005, the Aga Khan Planning and Building Service received the US $1 million Alcan Prize for Sustainability for its efforts to improve housing conditions as well as water and sanitation facilities in Pakistan through the Water and Sanitation Extension Program (WASEP).

== See also ==
- Aga Khan Development Network
- Aga Khan Planning and Building Services
- Building and Construction Improvement Program
