= Salimah Aga Khan =

Fashion model and mother of Aga Khan V

- Begum Aga Khan; Lady James Charles Crichton-Stuart
- Born: Sarah Frances Croker Poole; 28 January 1941 (age 85); New Delhi, British India
- Spouse: Lord James Charles Crichton-Stuart (m. 1959; div. 1968) Aga Khan IV (m. 1969; div. 1995)
- Issue: Princess Zahra Aga Khan; Prince Rahim Aga Khan (Aga Khan V); Prince Hussain Aga Khan
- Father: Arthur Eric Croker Poole
- Mother: Jean Margaret Watson
- Religion: Nizari Ismaili Shia Islam

Salimah Aga Khan (née Sarah Frances Croker Poole; born 28 January 1941), also known as Begum Salimah Aga Khan, is a British socialite and former fashion model. She is the mother of Aga Khan V, imam of the Nizari Isma'ili Muslims, and she is an ex-wife of the 49th Ismaili Shia Imam and 4th Aga Khan, Prince Karim Aga Khan.

== Early life ==
Princess Salimah was born at New Delhi, British India, as Sarah Frances Croker Poole. She is the daughter of Lieutenant-Colonel Arthur Eric Croker Poole and his wife, Jean Margaret Watson. She was one of the last generation of debutantes to be presented to the Queen, in 1958.

She married, firstly, Lord James Charles Crichton-Stuart, son of John Crichton-Stuart, 5th Marquess of Bute and Lady Eileen Beatrice Forbes, on 25 June 1959. She and Crichton-Stuart were divorced in 1968.

She married, secondly, Prince Karim Aga Khan IV, son of Prince Aly Khan and Hon. Princess Taj-ud-dawlah Aga Khan, in 1969. During her marriage to the Aga Khan, her official name was Her Highness The Begum Aga Khan, although she remained informally known as Sally. Following their divorce in 1995, she kept the title of "Princess" (but losing the style "Highness").

In November 1995, "Jewels from the Personal Collection of Princess Salimah Aga Khan" realised $27,682,601 (equivalent to $58,490,754 in 2025) at Christie's, Geneva.

== Charitable career ==
She is now a child-welfare activist and a prominent supporter of the charity SOS Children's Villages, becoming its first International Ambassador. As part of her welfare activity she has also aided Afghan refugees.

She has also been active in the Aga Khan Development Network.

== Personal life ==
She has three children with the Aga Khan: Princess Zahra Aga Khan (born 18 September 1970), Aga Khan V (born 12 October 1971) and Prince Hussain Aga Khan (born 10 April 1974).

Salimah Aga Khan has lived in Geneva, Switzerland, since 1969.
