= Aga Khan Academies =

Educational initiative

Information
- Established: c. 2000
- Founder: Aga Khan IV
- Graduates: 1,500
- Affiliation: Aga Khan Development Network
- Website: Aga Khan Academies AKDN

The Aga Khan Academies is an initiative of the Aga Khan Development Network. When fully operational, the Aga Khan Academies network will consist of eighteen co-educational, K-12, non-denominational day and residential schools in fourteen countries in Africa, South and Central Asia, and the Middle East. The academic program is based on the internationally recognized International Baccalaureate curriculum.

The Academies network will eventually serve approximately 14,000 students, graduating approximately 1,000 students annually.

== Overview ==
The Aga Khan Academies, a network of day and residential K-12 schools, is one of the education agencies of the Aga Khan Development Network. The AKDN operates a number of education programs and institutions spanning from early childhood to university degrees and continuing professional development. Under this umbrella, the specific focus of the Aga Khan Academies is on leadership development for its students.

Each Academy also includes a Professional Development Centre that provides outreach professional development programs for teachers and school leaders from government and other nonprofit schools.

The Aga Khan Academies are being established in fourteen countries across Africa, South and Central Asia, and the Middle East. Four Academies are currently operating in Dhaka, Mombasa, Hyderabad, and Maputo. The next Academies include Dar es Salaam, Tanzania. The network of Academies will eventually include eighteen schools with a student enrollment of approximately 14,000 girls and boys, and more than 1,000 graduates annually.

== History ==
His Highness the Aga Khan, the Chairman of the Aga Khan Development Network, founded the Aga Khan Academies as one of the AKDN's agencies in 2000.

An education must equip students with the tools that enable them to adapt and thrive in a world characterised by change.

— Aga Khan IV

In 2003, the first Aga Khan Academy opened in Mombasa, Kenya on an eighteen-acre site in the Kizingo area. The academy started as a day school, with the residential program beginning in 2009. Since May 11, 2005, the Aga Khan Academy, Mombasa has been recognized as an International Baccalaureate World School when its Diploma Programme was accredited. The Middle Years Programme and Primary Years Programme were accredited by the IB in 2009 and 2007, respectively.

In 2006, construction began on the second Aga Khan Academy in Hyderabad, India on a 100-acre site gifted by the State Government near the Rajiv Gandhi International Airport. The academy's Junior school opened in August 2011. The Senior School and the residential program for senior students opened in 2012, with the first class graduating in 2014. Since September 6, 2012, the Aga Khan Academy, Hyderabad has been designated as an International Baccalaureate World School when the Diploma Programme was accredited. The Middle Years Programme and the Primary Years Programme were authorised in 2014.

The third Aga Khan Academy opened in Maputo, Mozambique in 2013 with the lower grades of the Junior School. The full Academy is being constructed on a site of approximately fifty-four acres, about twenty kilometers from Maputo's city center. The Aga Khan Academy, Maputo, Mozambique is currently an International Baccalaureate candidate school for the Primary Years Programme.

In 2014, the Microsoft Corporation recognized the Aga Khan Academy, Mombasa as a Showcase School, a designation given to 150 schools worldwide. The academy is the only Showcase School in East Africa and one of two schools in Sub-Saharan Africa.

In 2014, Education World ranked the Aga Khan Academy, Hyderabad as the sixth best international day-cum-boarding school in India and the best in Hyderabad.

== Facilities and architecture ==
The Aga Khan Academies campuses are purpose built and designed to include core buildings and facilities that are common across all the schools. However, the specific topography of each site, as well as the local culture and architectural idioms, influence the design of each Academy, resulting in significant differences among the academy campuses.

“Each campus is to be designed by renowned architects" and is equipped with facilities such as theatres, libraries, laboratories, and cafeterias.

In addition to academic learning spaces such as classrooms, laboratories and libraries, each campus includes facilities such as a swimming pool, music and art rooms, a field for outdoor games and a gymnasium for indoor sports. Campuses may also include tennis courts, cricket pitches, and ice-skating rinks. The residential facilities accommodate boarding and dorm parents, who are teachers who live on campus. All residences include a student lounge, study areas and a laundry facility.

The size of the campus will vary from one academy to another. For example, the Aga Khan Academy in Mombasa, Kenya, inspired by Swahili architecture, rests on a 7.3-hectare (18-acre) parcel of land, whereas the academy in Hyderabad is on a 40-hectare (99-acre) plot. The Hyderabad Academy campus has been designed by India's HCP Design and Project and Management Private Limited under the directorship of Bimal Patel.

== The campuses and accreditation ==
Education at the Aga Khan Academies is based on the International Baccalaureate programme. It consists of three levels of study during the K-12 school years:

1. The Primary Years Programme for ages 3–12
2. The Middle Years Programme for ages 11–16
3. The Diploma Programme for ages 16–19

Each Aga Khan Academy is authorised by the International Baccalaureate to offer the programmes.

Each Aga Khan Academy also offers a dual language program in English and the local language. Admission entry points for day and boarding school students exist at the Primary Years Programme, Middle Years and Diploma Programme levels. The Aga Khan Academy, Mombasa and the Aga Khan Academy, Hyderabad are boarding schools for Middle Years and Diploma Programme students. The residential facilities accommodate students and teachers.

== List of academies ==
The Aga Khan Academies are being established in fourteen countries across Africa, South and Central Asia, and the Middle East. Currently, there are operational academies in:

- Aga Khan Academy Dhaka, Bangladesh
- Aga Khan Academy Hyderabad, India
- Aga Khan Academy Maputo, Mozambique
- Aga Khan Academy Mombasa, Kenya

== Curriculum ==
The curriculum at the Aga Khan Academies teaches the core subject requirements required by the International Baccalaureate program. Student scores on exams have exceeded the annual average IB scores.

== Admissions ==
Each academy will enroll approximately 700 to 1,200 young men and women. The academy seeks students from pre-primary through higher secondary levels representing a diverse range of economic, cultural, ethnic and religious backgrounds. Students should have the ability and motivation to excel academically and should demonstrate leadership in community service and other co-curricular pursuits.

Admission is means-blind and competitive, based on student merit. The academy endeavours to meet the demonstrated financial need of each admitted student.

== Partnerships ==
In addition to belonging to the Aga Khan Development Network and working with the Aga Khan Education Services, the academies are part of the International Academic Partnership (IAP). The IAP is an international joint venture that was conceived in 1990 and came into being in 1993. It includes such institutions as Phillips Academy in Andover, US, Schule Schloss in Salem, Germany and the Institute for Educational Development – Pakistan and Tanzania, East Africa. at the Aga Khan University. The partnership has brought together over 400 schools from South Asia, East Africa and the United States, and over 500 teachers.

The Aga Khan Program for Islamic Architecture at Harvard University and the Massachusetts Institute of Technology, the University of Central Asia, the Aga Khan University, the University of Calgary, the University of Toronto, and Oxford University are providing resources to the academies and their development. Other partnerships are national governments such as that of India which donated 40 hectares of land in the southern Andhra Pradesh state for the Hyderabad Academy.
