= Women in Ismailism =

Women of the Ismaili sect are part of Shia Islam. Some subsects have women's rights issues; others observe a relatively progressive environment within their sects, which is also dependent on the laws in the countries practicing this sect.

== History ==
=== Context of Ismailism ===
Ismailism is a sect within Islam that reveres a living Imam, who is a direct descendant of Ali and Fatima, the son-in-law and daughter of the Prophet Muhammad, respectively. His hereditary connection to the Prophet gives him the authority to serve as the community's spiritual (and non-spiritual) guide. The Imam heads the Ismaili community and interprets the Quran with a special ability to understand the batin, the esoteric meanings of the religion.

=== Reforms accepted by Nizari Ismaili Imams ===
The Nizari Ismaili Imams (known as the Aga Khans since the 18th century have instituted reforms in the status and treatment of women in the community. Aga Khan III, the 48th Nizari Ismaili Imam, was active in this movement. He entered the role at an early age after his father's early death, so his mother, Lady Ali Shah, played a role during his early years. The influence of women during his rule continued in his later years with his wife Umm Habiba. Imam Aga Khan III ruled from 1885 to 1957, and the next 49th Imam, his grandson, Imam Aga Khan IV, commenced his rule in 1957. A majority of Aga Khan III's efforts focused on reforming Islamic marriage contract laws, which helped improve women's status within the Nizari Ismaili community.

== Reforms (on marriage, divorce, segregation and education) ==
Imam Aga Khan III's message focused on promoting the idea that women were free and independent. In a message to his followers in 1926, he proclaimed that:

I do not want Ismaili women dependent on anyone—their parents, husbands, or anyone except God…I have no doubt that the whole spirit and teaching of my ancestor the Holy Prophet encouraged the evolution of all legitimate freedom and legitimate equality before men and women.

He encouraged women to participate in social and political affairs and criticized veiling as well as gender segregation, including the acts of pardah (masking of oneself from the public) and zenana (restraint on women from leaving the home).

Aga Khan III believed economic independence was key to achieving this equality and freedom. By becoming educated and earning their own livelihood, women would no longer be seen as a burden on their parents or spouses. He proclaimed:

I am trying to guide our young women’s lives into entirely new channels. I want to see them able to earn their livings in trades and professions, so they are not economically dependent on marriage, nor a burden on their fathers and brother[s].

In effect, marriage would no longer be imposed on women due to economic necessity. The Aga Khan III realized that education was at the forefront of this reform and encouraged parents who only had enough money to send one child to school to send their daughters. This advocacy for education was not limited to elementary literacy. To ensure girls had access to education, the government instituted a minimum marriageable age for both boys and girls, and banned child marriage. Marriage against the bride's will was outlawed, as brides were to sign the marriage contracts of their own choice. Other reforms in marriage laws included decisions on polygamy and divorce. In 1905, polygamy was permitted, with the condition of the "maintenance of the first wife", and later that was changed to only be allowed for specific reasons. In 1962, polygamy was outlawed within the Nizari Ismaili community. Women were allowed to divorce their husbands, and for a husband to divorce his wife, he was required to stand before a council which ultimately decided whether the divorce was granted or denied. Aga Khan III worked to eliminate and reduce the stigma around divorces and divorced women.

In prayer spaces, Ismaili men and women stand side by side (in other Muslim prayer settings, men stand in front of women) and are not separated by a physical barrier, as in most Muslim mosques. Ismaili women may also lead congregations (consisting of both men and women) in prayer.

== Contemporary efforts ==
Imam Aga Khan IV takes a different approach to women's rights than his grandfather. While Imam Aga Khan III instituted direct legal and religious laws, the Aga Khan IV focuses on communal development in educational and social affairs. His style addresses his followers and encourages them to take initiative in achieving the desired results. His daughter, Princess Zahra Aga Khan, works on policies related to women's development. In 1997, she hosted the first-ever International Conference of Ismaili Women in Toronto.

== Barriers to reforms ==
A discrepancy exists between the rights offered to women through these reforms and the actual realization of the practice of those rights. Cultural norms and views continue to guide many members of the community who criticize the reforms as being influenced by western values. The Aga Khan responded to this critique by claiming that:

While the words of the Koran remain the same, every generation, every century, every period must have a new and different interpretation of the past, otherwise Islam will die and will not survive the competition of some healthy less rigid competitors.

Additional barriers to the practice of reforms include the fact that the councils implementing the reforms are often majority male and may still adhere to patriarchal norms. The laws of the countries where Ismaili women live also affect reform implementation. Sharia law, common in most Sunni-majority countries, is often in contrast to the Ismaili reforms, and so residents of these countries must adhere to the country's rules and regulations. The situation of Ismaili women depends on factors including their government and its laws, economic ability, resource availability, and global conditions.
