= Aga Khan Lycée, Khorog =

Coordinates: 37.488°N 71.590°E

The Aga Khan Lycée Khorog

Location
- Khorog, Tajikistan

Information
- Type: Private; Primary, Secondary
- Established: 1998
- Affiliation: Aga Khan Education Services
- Website: http://www.agakhanschools.org

The Aga Khan Lycée, Khorog is a school that was established in September 1998. Emomali Rahmonov, the President of the Republic of Tajikistan, inaugurated the school with the Aga Khan.

The Lycée, part of the Aga Khan Education Services (AKES), is built on the premises of the former School #3 (named after Kirov), a school with a distinguished history in Gorno Badakhshan Autonomous Oblast (GBAO). The majority of students are from Badakhshan, Tajikistan with some from other countries.

The Aga Khan Schools strive to create a harmonious balance between academic demands, sporting and cultural activities and community life. It challenges its pupils to be intellectually inquisitive and socially conscious. The Lycée believes that while what students know is important, the true measure of a student's education is the ability to analyse what they do not know.

== See also ==
- Aga Khan Development Network
