= Aga Khan School, Osh =

The Aga Khan School Osh

Location
- Osh, Kyrgyz Republic
- Coordinates: 40.512781°N 72.806009°E

Information
- Type: Private; Secondary
- Established: 2002
- Affiliation: Aga Khan Education Services
- Website: www.agakhanschools.org

The Aga Khan School, Osh, in the Kyrgyz Republic, was established in September 2002. On October 30, 2002, the Governor of Osh Oblast, Naken Kasiev, inaugurated the School in the presence of His Highness the Aga Khan.

The school is part of the Aga Khan Education Services (AKES). It strives to create a harmonious balance between academic demands, sporting and cultural activities and community life. It challenges its pupils to be intellectually inquisitive and socially conscious.

== See also ==
- Aga Khan Development Network
