= Franklin White =

Canadian public health scientist

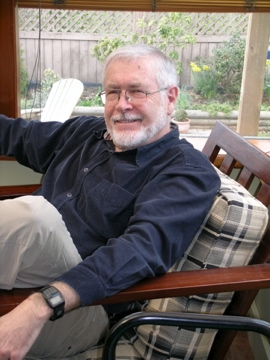
- White at home, circa 2008
- Born: Franklin Marshall Matthews White; June 7, 1946; Perth, Australia
- Education: London School of Hygiene & Tropical Medicine; McGill University; University of Queensland
- Known for: Epidemiology, public health, international development
- Awards: Medal of Honor Pan American Health Organization 1997 Breakthrough Award for Creativity, Academy for Educational Development 1990

Franklin Marshall Matthews White (born 1946) is a Canadian public health scientist focused on capacity building for international and global education, research and development. He advocates:

"Public health...must not be left to the international community to define; it is...the responsibility of the countries themselves to define their priorities. The global agenda should be viewed as complementary at best."

"Health is mostly made in homes, communities and workplaces and only a minority of ill health can be repaired in clinics and hospitals."

"Nations (must) assess their public health human resource needs and develop their ability to deliver this capacity, and not depend on other countries to supply it."

"Public health and primary health care are the cornerstones of sustainable health systems, and this should be reflected in the health policies and professional education systems of all nations."

== Early life ==
Born in Perth, Western Australia (1946), his family lived in Kuala Lumpur (1946–50) during the Malayan emergency, engaged in post-war reconstruction; his father Frank T. M. White, was then appointed founding professor of Mining and Metallurgical Engineering, University of Queensland. Visiting field sites and taking seasonal employment in the industry, he came to appreciate that how people live and work impacts their health. While in secondary school, he qualified as a Petty Officer, Australian Navy Cadets, was prominent in track and field, and qualified (1963) as a junior rugby referee; as a Queensland junior champion (1964), he represented the state in the 1965 Australian Athletics Championships. A Babayaga Trio member, he participated in Australian folk music.

== Education ==
His primary education was at Ironside State School and Brisbane Boys College; his secondary education was at the Anglican Church Grammar School. Following scholarship-assisted studies at University of Queensland, he obtained MD, CM degrees from McGill University in 1969. During an internship at Royal Jubilee Hospital, he engaged in educational research with L'Université de Sherbrooke. In 1970-71, he joined the Ministry of Health (British Columbia) as a trainee, then enrolled with the London School of Hygiene and Tropical Medicine under the tutelage of social epidemiologist Jerry Morris, gaining an MSc in 1973. During these studies he was recruited and seconded by McGill to the Medical Research Council's Pneumoconiosis Research Unit, Cardiff University School of Medicine, in contact with Archie Cochrane, pioneer of evidence-based medicine. He earned specialty recognition in Canada (FRCPC 1982) and in the United Kingdom (FFPH 2003, by distinction).

== Career ==
=== Public health surveillance and investigation ===
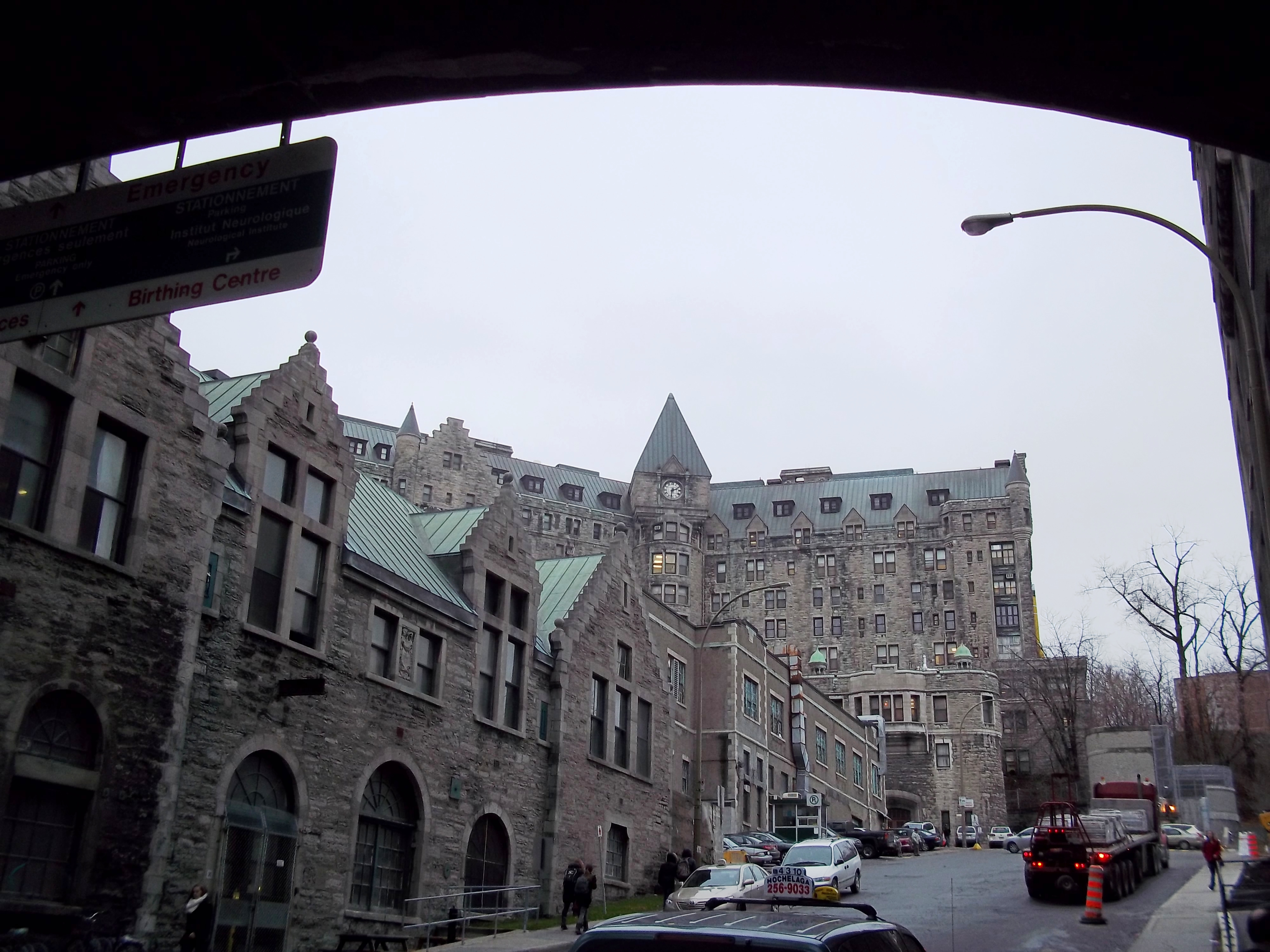
Royal Victoria Hospital, Montreal

Appointed to McGill's department of epidemiology and health in 1972, he focused on occupational and environmental health, and worked part-time in the Royal Victoria Hospital community clinic. In 1974, he joined Health Canada as chief, communicable disease epidemiology, and in 1975 initiated Canada Diseases Weekly Report, the nation's first data-supported surveillance report, and launched its Field Epidemiology Program. As director, communicable disease control and epidemiology for Alberta (1977–80), and then director of epidemiology for British Columbia (1980–82), he developed surveillance and investigation capacity. He published several novel investigations: Legionnaires' disease, shigellosis on a work train in Labrador, gastrointestinal infection related to pooled expressed breast milk, poliomyelitis in an unvaccinated religious community, and brucellosis in a slaughterhouse; he also published on imported diseases, health systems and immunization policy. He served on the National Advisory Committee on Epidemiology (1977–82), and the National Immunization Policy Committee (1978–81). He was co-chair (hygiene), Medical Committee, Commonwealth Games, Edmonton 1977-78.

=== Academic and professional leadership in Canada ===
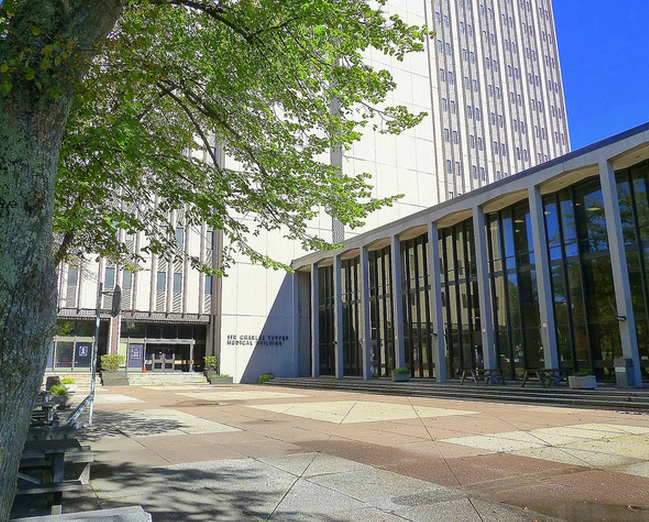
Dalhousie University, Halifax NS Faculty of Medicine

At age 36, he was appointed "Ezra Butler Eddy" Professor and Head, Community Health and Epidemiology at Dalhousie University (1982–89), and was an elected member of Senate for the same period. Cross-appointed to the Institute of Resource and Environmental Studies, he investigated human exposures to chemicals and pesticides. Using Canada Fitness Survey data, he focused on obesity measurement and prevalence, and was first to reveal an independent association of waist:hip ratio (abdominal obesity) with hypertension in males. A field investigation revealed the world's most northerly occurrence of endemic ascariasis. Using records linkage, he investigated cancer incidence and mortality in indoor workers; similar innovative methods were applied to an inter-provincial study of heart disease.

He served on Health Canada's Epidemiology Science Panel (1983–84), Task Force on Obesity (1983–86), and Advisory Committee on Weight Standards (1985–87), and chaired the Review Panel, National Cancer Incidence Reporting System. In 1986, he was appointed Chief Examiner in Community Medicine, Royal College of Physicians and Surgeons of Canada (3-year term). In 1988, he became a founding member, Board of Trustees, Environmental Health Foundation of Canada, serving until 1994.

Elected President of the Canadian Public Health Association (CPHA) 1986–88, he advocated an international role for the association. In November 1986, CPHA hosted the First International Conference on Health Promotion, which produced the Ottawa Charter for Health Promotion. Also in 1986, CPHA launched the federally-funded Canadian International Immunization Initiative, in support of Commonwealth and Francophonie Countries. He served on the board of the Canadian Society for International Health (1992–96).

=== Capacity building - international and global ===
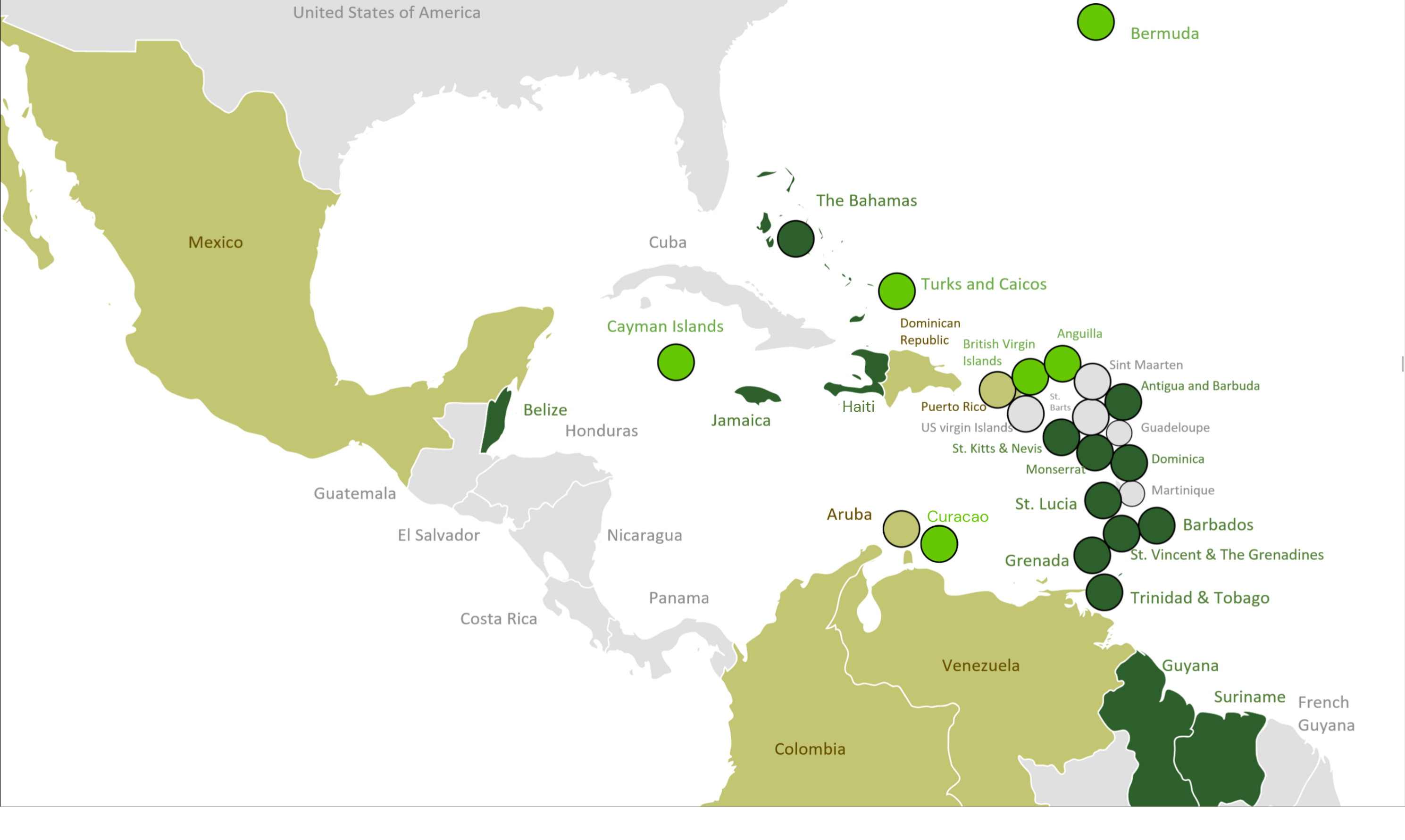
CARICOM member states

In international roles, he emphasized capacity building for public health education, research, policy and program development. Based in Port of Spain, Trinidad as Director (1989–95), Caribbean Epidemiology Centre (CAREC/PAHO/WHO), a reference agency for 22 member nations, he emphasized resource mobilization. This was applied to: social and behavioral sciences, laboratory information systems and immunology; priority infectious diseases and epidemiology training; promoting a non-communicable diseases agenda; and guiding the regional response to the HIV/AIDS pandemic. CAREC was later integrated within CARPHA, the Caribbean Public Health Agency, in 2013. During his term as Director, CAREC, White served on the Commonwealth Caribbean Medical Research Council, on the Technical Advisory Committee of the Caribbean Environmental Health Institute, and had formal observer status at the Caribbean Community (CARICOM) Health Ministers conferences.

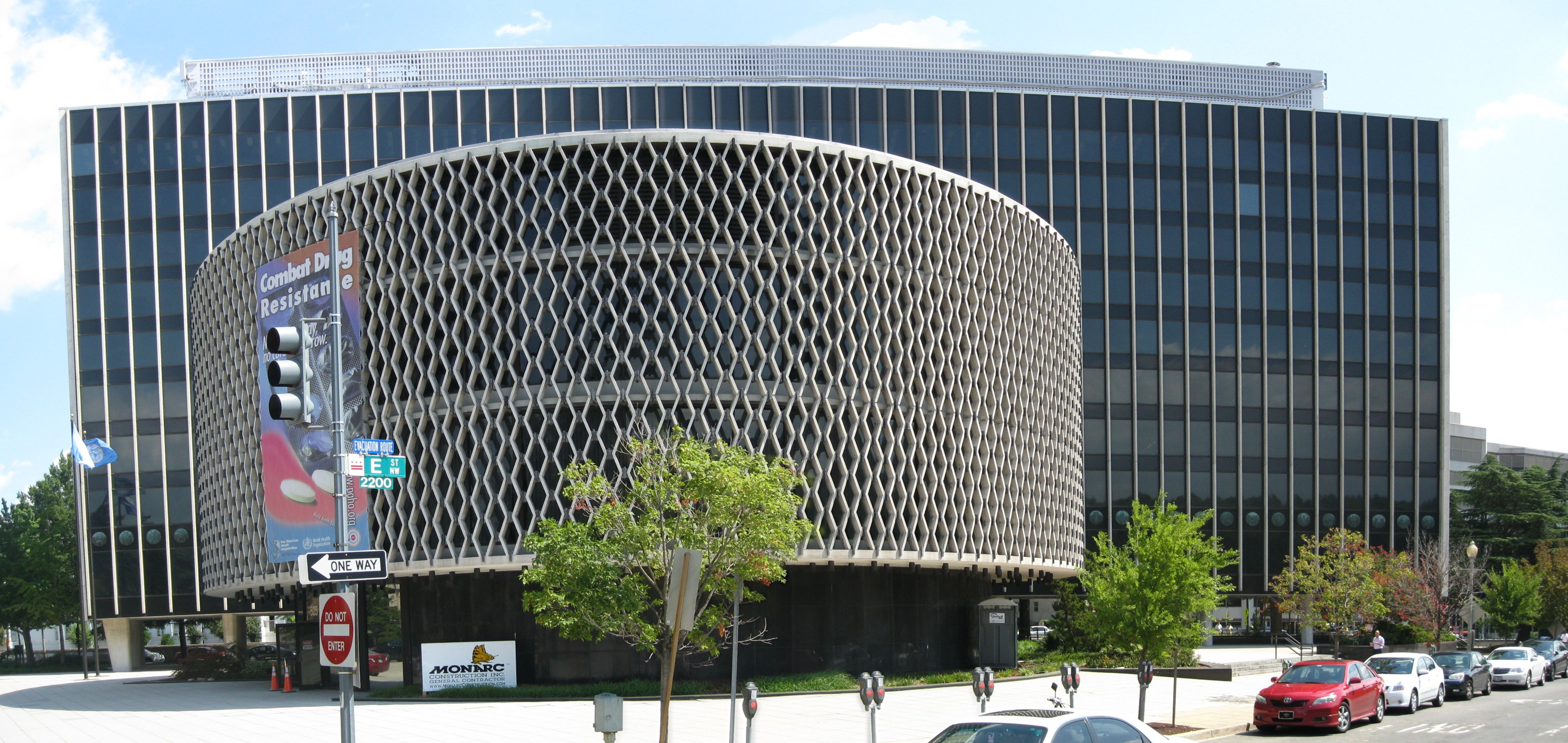
Pan American Health Organization headquarters building, Washington DC

Subsequently, based in Washington DC for the Pan American Health Organization (PAHO/WHO), promoting an evidence-based approach, in 1995 he guided development of a regional non-communicable disease (NCD) program focused on Latin America and the Caribbean. Initiatives included the Declaration of the Americas on Diabetes (DOTA), a public-private partnership modeled after the St. Vincent Declaration, the CARMEN model of integrated NCD prevention and control, and recognition of cervical cancer, accidents and violence as priorities. He negotiated terms of reference for two new WHO Collaborating Centers: The University of Texas M. D. Anderson Cancer Center, to become Collaborating Center for Supportive Cancer Care (1996–2008); and Centro de Endocrinología Experimental y Aplicada (CENEXA), National University of La Plata, as Collaborating Centre for Diabetes Research, Education and Care (1997–2015). He served on the Board of Appeal, and the Implementation Group: performance planning and evaluation system.

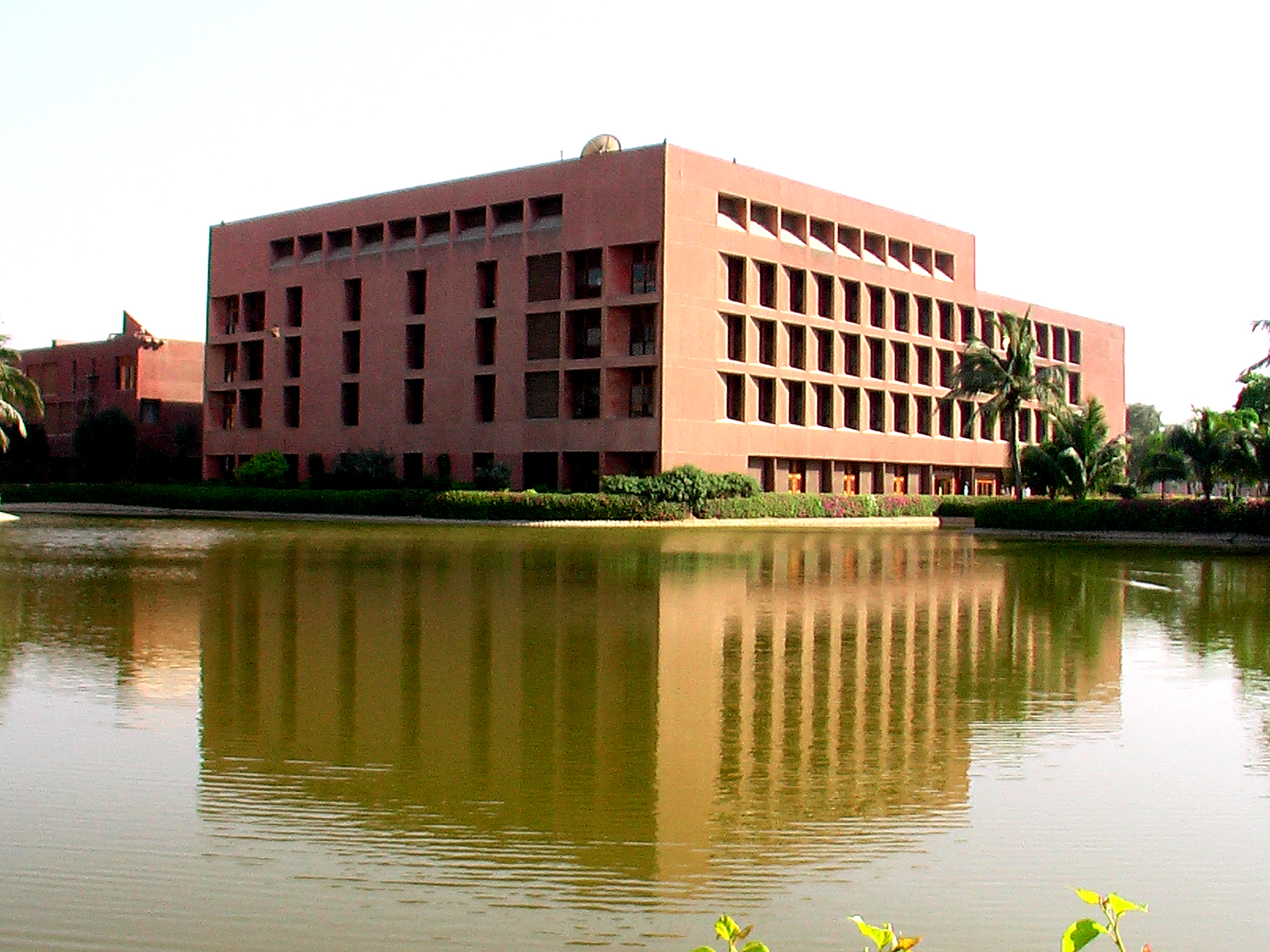
Aga Khan University's Karachi campus.

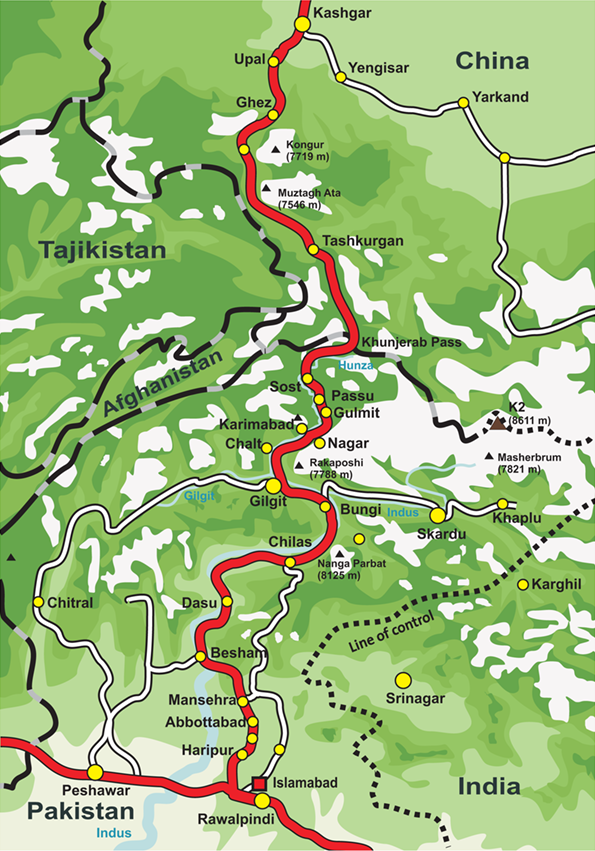
Route of the Karakoram Highway

As Noordin M Thobani Professor and chair, Community Health Sciences, Aga Khan University (AKU), Karachi, (1998–2003), he focused on South Asia, espousing the principle: "Public health...must not be left to the international community to define; it is primarily the responsibility of the countries themselves to define their priorities. The global agenda should be viewed as complementary at best...". At AKU he promoted population health, field studies, systems research, and community-based training. He guided the design and implementation of an MSc in health policy and management, and intervention evaluations in hard-to-reach settings (see map of Karakorum Highway), such as the Water and Sanitation Extension Program. He engaged in many locally conducted studies, including: childhood illnesses, tuberculosis, HIV/AIDS/STI, reproductive health, health systems, environmental health, and NCDs.

In association with University of Alabama at Birmingham (1999–2003), focused on initiatives in Pakistan, he chaired the US National Institutes of Health, Fogarty International Center: advisory and selection committee for the AIDS International Training and Research Program, and was Principal Foreign Collaborator for: the Maternal and Child Health Research and Training Program, and the International Research and Training in Environmental and Occupational Health Program. From 2004 to 2009, he served on the International Advisory Board, National Action Plan, NCD Prevention, Control & Health Promotion, Pakistan.

During the Iraq War and the War in Afghanistan (2001–14), White published his views and concerns in scientific journals: on the case for an epidemiology of terrorism and the potential for successive waves of violence, lamenting the "lack of enlightened leadership... which has brought us to this...": the targeting of water supply infrastructure, "collateral damage" among children, and need for a stronger response from the global community, citing international law.

=== Health systems planning, monitoring and evaluation ===
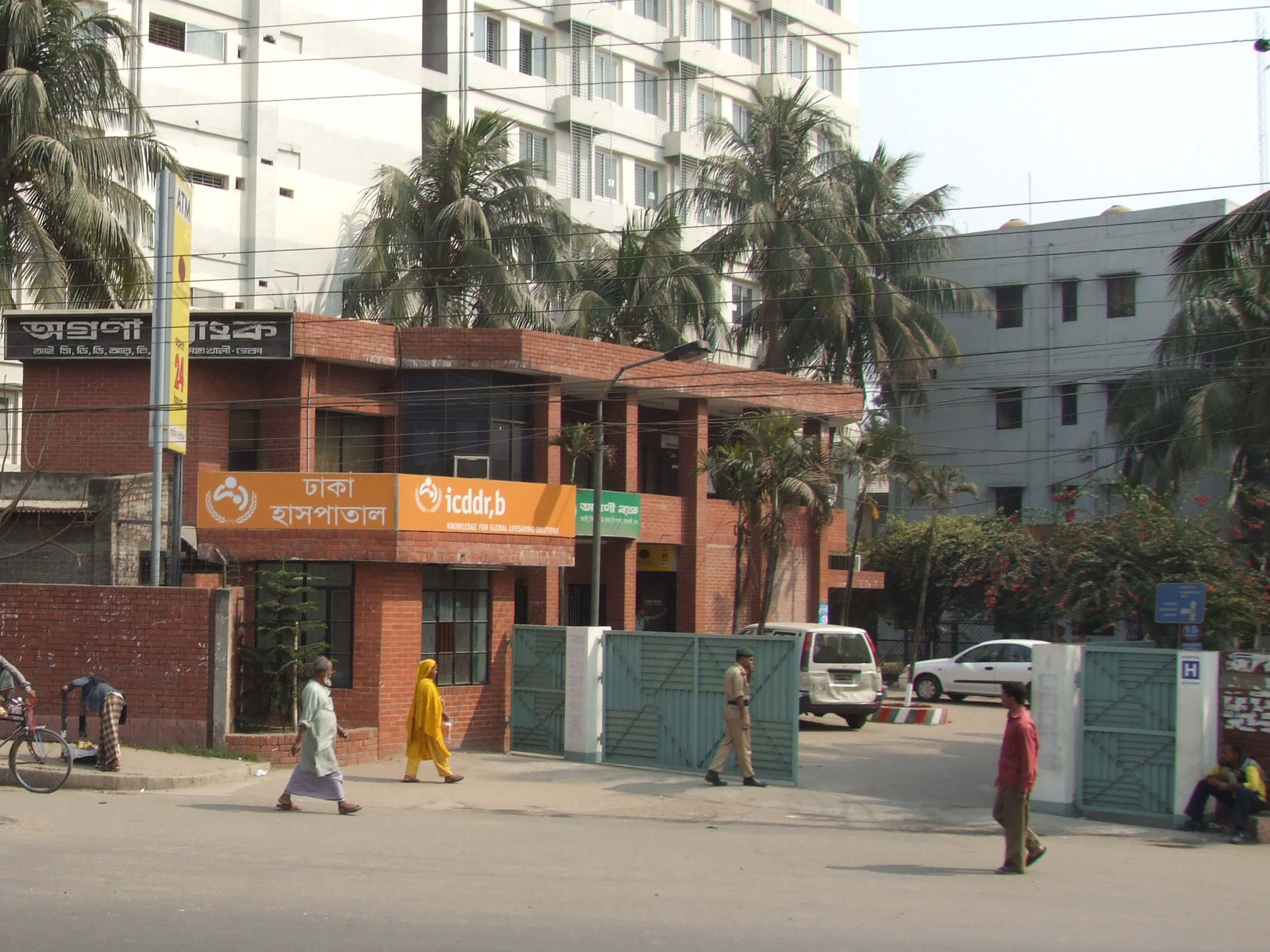
Entrance to the icddr,b head office, in Mohakhali, Dhaka.

In 2003, White launched Pacific Health & Development Sciences Inc. (PacificSci), a firm engaged in third party monitoring and evaluation of large scale health interventions e.g., Amref Health Africa; International Centre for Diarrhoeal Disease Research, Bangladesh (icddr,b); Pakistan's Lady Health Worker Program (external reviewer to Oxford Policy Management); the International Development Research Centre; and (in support of Universalia Management Group, Ottawa-Montreal) the World Health Organization. PacificSci disincorporated in 2020. He served on the advisory board (2008–12) to establish the School of Public Health and Social Policy at University of Victoria, and on the inaugural international advisory board (health sciences) for Qatar University. For Kuwait University, he guided plans for a Faculty of Public Health (launched 2014). His health systems research emphasizes that "health is mostly made in homes, communities and workplaces and only a minority of ill health can be repaired in clinics and hospitals", that "nations (must) assess their public health human resource needs and develop their ability to deliver this capacity, and not depend on other countries to supply it." and that "public health and primary health care are the cornerstones of sustainable health systems, and this should be reflected in the health policies and professional education systems of all nations." He has also addressed the application of disease etiology and natural history to prevention in primary health care.

=== Contributions to the reference literature ===
White has authored over 300 publications. He contributed to editions of the International Epidemiological Association's Dictionary of Epidemiology, and as associate editor to John M Last, in A Dictionary of Public Health (2007). His editorial board service includes inter alia the Canadian Journal of Public Health (Chair 1982–86), the American Journal of Infection Control, the Journal of Public Health Policy, Medical Principles and Practice, and the Global Journal of Medicine and Public Health, emphasizing development settings. He coauthored "international and global health" in Public Health and Preventive Medicine (McGraw Hill 2008). He is senior author of Global Public Health - Ecological Foundations (Oxford University Press 2013).

== Recognition ==
Franklin White received the Medal of Honor (1997), PAHO/WHO's highest staff award, and the Breakthrough Award for Creativity (1990) from AED (non-profit) for socio-behavioral HIV/AIDS interventions. In 2011, he was selected by the London School of Hygiene and Tropical Medicine as a case study (30 alumni globally). He has been keynote speaker in several countries, including: webinar to honor the 100th Anniversary of the Canadian Public Health Association (2010); launching of SHOW (Survey of the Health of Wisconsin), USA, 2008; Inauguration Address "Ibn Ridwan" building, AKU, Karachi in the presence of the Aga Khan, 2000; "Bicentenario del Nacimiento de Jose Cayetano Heredia" hosted by la Academia Nacional de Medicina, Peru, 1997; and visiting scientist, WHO Collaborating Center for Rural & Border Health, University of Arizona, 1993. In 1990, he hosted Anne, Princess Royal, on her visit to the Caribbean Epidemiology Centre.

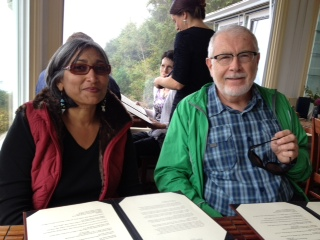
Debra J Nanan and Franklin White Tea at Point No Point, BC, Sept 2012

== Personal life ==
White lives in Victoria, BC, with Debra J Nanan, a retired epidemiologist. He has three children by prior marriage, and four grandchildren. At the 1990 World Masters Athletics North American Championships, he won the silver medal in pentathlon and bronze in 400 metres hurdles. In 1992 he published an account of sailing a small boat from Nova Scotia to the West Indies. In 2005, one of a 3-man crew, he sailed a 42-foot ketch from Hawaii to British Columbia. In 2020 he authored his father's biography Miner with a Heart of Gold - biography of a mineral science and engineering educator.
