= Hussain Aga Khan =

Son of Aga Khan IV and Prince of Iranian Qajar dynasty

Prince Hussain Aga Khan
- Born: 10 April 1974 (age 52); Geneva, Switzerland
- Spouse: Kristin J. White (m. 2006; div. 2011) Elizabeth Hoag (m. 2019)
- House: Fatimid
- Father: Aga Khan IV
- Mother: Salimah Aga Khan
- Religion: Nizari Ismaili Shia Islam

Prince Hussain Aga Khan (born 10 April 1974) is a nature photographer, and is the third child and second son of Karim al-Husseini (Aga Khan IV) and his first wife, Salimah Aga Khan. He is the younger brother of Rahim Aga Khan V.

== Early life and education ==
He attended Deerfield Academy and subsequently Williams College, from which he graduated in 1997 with a dual degree in theatre and French literature. In 2004, he received a Master of International Affairs degree from Columbia’s School of International and Public Affairs, where his main area of study was Economic and Political Development with a regional focus on the Middle East and North Africa.

== Nature and photography ==
Hussain has been a tropical fish hobbyist since the age of five and a reptile and amphibian enthusiast since he was 14, when he started scuba diving and developed an interest in conservation.

An assembly of his rainforest photographs from seven countries, entitled Rainforests and including statistics related to deforestation and biodiversity, appeared in three exhibits in the US in 2004.

His photographs, including those focused on rainforests, have been published in Animal Voyage in 2004 (a new edition was printed in 2007). Since 2009, his focus has mainly been on underwater photography, especially of turtles, sharks, whales and dolphins. His second book, Diving into Wildlife (2015) contains a selection of these images.

His work has been exhibited in Geneva, in Paris at the Maison Européenne de la Photographie (2007), at the Oceanographic Museum of Monaco for the Blue Ocean Film Festival and for the 10-year anniversary of Prince Albert’s foundation (2015 and 2016 respectively), and at the IUCN ocean conference in Hawaii in 2016. His photography was shown at the Sustainable Blue Economy Conference in Nairobi (2018) and his photography of ocean life was on display at the National Museum of Natural History and Science of the University of Lisbon from 27 September to 29 December 2019, in an exhibition called "The Living Sea: Photographic Essay by Hussain Aga Khan".

== Career ==
Prince Hussain is based in Geneva and working with the Aga Khan Trust for Culture. Following completion of a master's degree in international affairs from Columbia’s School of International and Public Affairs in 2004, Hussain started working for the Aga Khan Foundation under the auspices of the Prince Sadruddin Aga Khan Fund for the Environment (PSAKFE). Hussain is chair of the board of the Aga Khan Agency for Habitat, where he focuses mainly on disaster risk reduction and emergency management in Central Asia, Pakistan and India. He is on the board of the Aga Khan Trust for Culture (AKTC), and sits on the ECC, the Environment and Climate Committee, established and chaired by his brother, the Aga Khan.

Hussain is an Ocean Elder, a board member of Mission Blue, a member of the Jane Goodall Legacy Foundation’s Council for Hope, of the National Geographic Hubbard Council and of The Wild Dolphin Project’s scientific advisory board.

Focused On Nature, the small conservation organisation that Hussain established with Nazir Sunderji in 2014, has mainly supported the conservation of sharks, cetaceans, rainforests, African elephants and rhinoceroses.

== Personal life ==
On April 27, 2006, Hussain announced his engagement to Kristin J. White, an American he met while attending graduate school at Columbia University. She converted to Islam and took the name Khaliya Aga Khan. Hussain and Khaliya were married in a religious ceremony on Saturday 16 September 2006, by Sayyed Mohammad Musawi at Château de Chantilly. Hussain and Khaliya divorced in 2011.

In December 2018, Hussain became engaged to Elizabeth Hoag, a mental health counselor from Connecticut. The couple married in a private ceremony in Geneva on 27 September 2019, with Hoag adopting the name Fareen upon converting to Islam.
