= Aga Khan University Hospital, Nairobi =

Hospital in Nairobi, Kenya (founded 1958)

Coordinates: 1°15′41″S 36°49′27″E

The Aga Khan University Hospital, Nairobi
- Aga Khan Health Services

Geography
- Location: 3rd Parklands Avenue, Limuru Road, Nairobi, Kenya

Organisation
- Care system: Private
- Type: Teaching
- Affiliated university: Aga Khan University

Services
- Standards: ISO 9001:2015
- Beds: 300

History
- Founded: 1958

Links
- Website: https://hospitals.aku.edu/nairobi/Pages/default.aspx
- Lists: Hospitals in Kenya

The Aga Khan University Hospital (AKUH, N) in Nairobi, Kenya, established in 1958, is a 300-bed long-term care facility offering general medical services, specialist clinics and diagnostic services. The hospital receives referrals for specialised medical care and diagnostic services from various hospitals and clinics in the region.

Founded by His Highness Aga Khan IV, the hospital provides a broad range of secondary and tertiary care, including diagnosis of disease and team management of patient care. The hospital also offers Home Care services in Nairobi, since 2024.

== Administration ==
The hospital's current CEO is Rashid Khalani, who previously served as the Chief Finance Officer at the medical institution.

=== Previous Hospital CEOs ===
- Shawn Bolouki- 2014 to February 2022
- Asmita Gillani: 2006 to November 2014

In October 2023, the hospital went paperless, with the adoption of an Electronic Health Records system. This has enabled interoperability within the hospital's several facilities. The data is used to generate insights that drive research and policy at the hospital.

=== Clinical Research Unit, AKUH- Nairobi ===
The unit was established in November 2020 to advance Cancer research in the East and Central Africa region. It is directed by Professor Mansoor Saleh.

In February 2023, AKUH, Nairobi, through this unit, launched clinical trial for a cancer drug to evaluate its effectiveness. This was the only site in Africa selected to carry out this study.

== Accreditation ==
- Joint Commission International (JCI) Accreditation, after consistent assessment of its performance against 291 standards and 1,199 measurable elements. The hospital's latest reaccreditation was in 2022, having received its first accreditation in 2013. Additionally, two of the hospital's clinical programmes have also been accredited by the Joint Commission International:
  1. Centre of excellence for management of heart attacks in 2020- reaccredited in October 2023.
  2. Centre of excellence for management of acute primary stroke in 2021- with reaccreditation done in 2024.
- In 2018, the hospital's laboratory was accredited by the College of American Pathologists.
- The hospital's laboratory has a South African National Accreditation System (SANAS) accreditation, first received in 2011. The hospital was recertified in November 2024, under the ISO 15189:2022 standards.
- ISO 9001:2008 Award in July 2003 by the International Organisation for Standardisation. It was replaced by ISO 9001:2015 in May 2018.

=== Services ===
The hospital offers several services including: emergency and critical care, diagnostic and lab services, surgical and medical specialties, women's health, paediatric health, outpatient and specialised clinics, rehabilitation and support services, dental and eye care, vaccination and preventive healthcare.

== Grants ==
- In February 2025, The Aga Khan University Hospital, Nairobi won a $100,000 grant from Astra Zeneca, for a study on Breast Cancer care.
- In August 2022, Aga Khan University Hospital, Nairobi (AKUH,N) and the Aga Khan Health Services, East Africa were awarded a Kshs. 950M grant from the German Government to boost the COVID-19 vaccination campaign in East Africa and support the public health system.
- In 2022, the Aga Khan hospitals in East Africa, including AKUH, Nairobi, received a 2.3 million Euros grant from Proparco to enhance oxygen infrastructure and support patient care during the COVID-19 pandemic.
- In 2020, the hospital was part of the beneficiaries of a Ksh 720 million grant for COVID-19 protection and diagnosis.

== Specialized services ==
In February 2025, the hospital opened the first cholesterol disorders clinic in the country.

Aside from Egypt and South Africa, AKUH, Nairobi offers Neurointerventional surgery, which they started doing locally in 2015.

The hospital became the first in the East and Central Africa region to acquire a PET CT scanner and cyclotron.

=== Achievements ===
The AKUH,Nairobi received an award in 2024 for their environmental sustainability practices. The hospital won the National Energy Globe Award from the Energy Globe Foundation Austria for their innovative Biomass Boiler Project.

=== Notable events ===
In 2016, the hospital offered free cancer treatment to 400 Ugandans, after the country's only radiotherapy machine at Mulago Hospital broke.

The hospital conducted the first penile implant procedure in the region in February 2022.

In 2024, Jenifer Lewis, while in an interview, applauded the AKUH, Nairobi for the care she received after a near-fatal accident while on a trip in Serengeti, Tanzania, in 2022. She had a nine-hour surgery done on her at the hospital where she afterwards spent six days in intensive care.

== See also ==
- Aga Khan University
- Aga Khan Hospital, Kisumu
- Aga Khan Hospital, Mombasa
- Aga Khan Medical Outpatient Medical Centres
- Aga Khan Development Network
