= First MicroFinance Bank (Afghanistan) =

Bank in Afghanistan

First MicroFinance Bank-Afghanistan (FMFB-A) is a banking and loan institution of Aga Khan Agency for Microfinance which provides micro loans to poor and vulnerable population, particularly women. The Bank was established in 2004.

Logo of this bank.

== See also ==
- First MicroFinance Bank-Tajikistan
- First MicroFinance Bank-Pakistan
