= Aga Khan Prize =

Aga Khan Prize may refer to:

- Aga Khan Award for Architecture
- Aga Khan Prize for Fiction, given out by the editors of The Paris Review
