= Aga Khan Academy, Hyderabad =

Coordinates: 17°14′50.29″N 78°28′52.24″E

Aga Khan Academy
- Hyderabad, Telangana; India

Information
- Established: 2011

Aga Khan Academy, Hyderabad is an international school in Hyderabad, India. It is located near Rajiv Gandhi International Airport and also Pahadi Shareef.

== History ==
The Aga Khan Academies are a network of residential schools for talented students spanning from Africa and the Middle East, to South and Central Asia.

Admission is means-blind and based on merit. Financial aid is available to ensure access for accepted students regardless of financial circumstances, although is only applicable to Indian Residents. When complete, the network of Academies will form a global learning community of about 18 schools in 14 countries. They will eventually serve approximately 14,000 girls and boys of exceptional calibre, graduating 1,500 students annually.

The Aga Khan Academies are an agency of the Aga Khan Development Network (AKDN), which is chaired by His Highness the Aga Khan. The AKDN has a long history of involvement in education in countries of the developing world, with the first schools now under the AKDN umbrella having been founded in 1905 in India and Zanzibar. Currently, AKDN agencies operate more than 240 schools and educational programmes ranging from early childhood through to post-graduate education.

== Establishment of the Aga Khan Academy, Hyderabad ==
Construction of the second Aga Khan Academy in Hyderabad began in 2006. The first intake of students was in August 2011 for the Junior School and 2012 for the Senior School, including the residential programme. The first class of the Senior School's International Baccalaureate programme graduated in 2014.

The academy's Professional Development Centre (PDC) began operating in July 2010, prior to the opening of the school. The first programme offered by the PDC was a series on Professional Learning for Educators. These are collaborative courses designed by the Aga Khan Academies with input from government and educational experts. Their aim is to improve the education of both students and teachers within the region.

== Curriculum ==
Its curriculum is built on the framework of the International Baccalaureate (IB).

== Admissions ==
Admission to the Aga Khan Academy, Hyderabad is based on merit, intelligence and talent of a child.

== Faculty ==
Faculty members also have the opportunity to collaborate with colleagues across the globe and to teach abroad within the Aga Khan Academies network.

== Facilities ==
Built on a 100-acre land near Rajiv Gandhi International Airport.

It is the second in a network of about 18 planned Academies offering education to students in countries across Africa, The Middle East, South and Central Asia. The campus is very huge and is purpose built.

The Commons Building houses the dining hall and an array of spaces for school activities. It is designed for major school functions, including music and drama performances, and public lectures.

Sports facilities are extensive and include: Swimming and diving pools, Sports fields, for example for soccer, hockey and athletics, Tennis courts, Squash courts, Basketball and Gym room.
