= Aga Khan Agency for Microfinance =

- Abbreviation: AKAM
- Formation: 2005
- Affiliations: Aga Khan Development Network
- Website: AKAM

Aga Khan Agency for Microfinance (AKAM) is a microfinancing agency of the Aga Khan Development Network.

== History ==
AKAM was formally inaugurated in February 2005 by Aga Khan IV and the former president of the World Bank, James Wolfensohn. The non-profit agency was created under Swiss law and is based in Geneva, Switzerland. It is governed by an independent board of directors chaired by the Aga Khan. AKAM brings together the financial services programming of the Aga Khan Development Network (AKDN) at the lower end of the ladder, unifying and consolidating their objectives and principles of development under one institutional umbrella.

The agency belongs to AKDN's social development branch and as such, AKAM operates in both rural and urban areas and seeks to alleviate poverty by helping to improve incomes and quality of life through various programs, initiatives, and partnerships. Today, AKAM operates in developing countries including Afghanistan, Burkina Faso, Côte d'Ivoire, Egypt, Kenya, the Kyrgyz Republic, Madagascar, Mali, Mozambique, Pakistan, Syria, Tajikistan, and Tanzania and provides various microfinance opportunities whose "versatility allows it to be adapted to the needs and circumstances of the poor in urban and rural environments."

At the end of 2010, it had 156 branches in South Asia, Central Asia, the Middle East, West Africa, and East Africa, with 3,120 employees. Since its establishment in 2005, AKAM has assumed responsibility for microfinance programs that were administered by other agencies within AKDN for more than 25 years. At the end of June 2010, the agency managed a loan portfolio of over US$147.7 million in outstanding micro, small, and medium-sized loans to over 287,240 beneficiaries in 13 countries.

=== Objectives and principles ===
The underlying objectives of the agency are to "alleviate economic and social exclusion, diminish the vulnerability of poor populations, and reduce poverty" so as to make the beneficiaries "self-reliant and eventually gain the skills needed to graduate to the mainstream financial markets." To articulate its approach, AKAM has formulated a series of key principles. These are:

1. Providing a broad range of microfinance services
2. Aiming to balance costs with revenue but also generate a modest surplus to contribute to the expansion of services and geographic coverage
3. operating alongside other AKDN agencies to draw on their experience
4. Utilizing institutional approaches and instruments that facilitate access and address the diversity of contexts and cultures
5. Consolidating all practices to ensure that procedures are transparent, efficient, and appropriately documented with trained staff
6. Focusing on positive growth as required by context and circumstance
7. Drawing on partnerships outside the network, such as governments, international agencies, and professional organizations, to expand the general frame of reference and maximize success

=== Partners ===
AKAM throughout the years has received support from numerous institutions all over the world. Support in this case is defined as the provision of funding and/or technical assistance. The following is a list of the international institutions and organizations which as of 2011 have supported AKAM:

- Agence Francaise de Dévéloppement
- Bill & Melinda Gates Foundation
- BlueOrchard
- Canadian International Development Agency
- DEG
- European Investment Bank
- European Bank for Reconstruction and Development
- Financierings-Maatschappij voor Ontwikkelingslanden (FMO)
- International Finance Corporation
- Japanese International Cooperation Agency
- Kreditanstalt fur Wiederaufbau (KfW)
- MicroFinanza Rating
- Microfinance Investment Support Facility for Afghanistan
- Okiocredit
- PlaNet Finance Group
- Triple Jump
- The World Bank Group
- United States Department of Agriculture
- United States Agency for International Development

== Institutions worldwide ==
=== Afghanistan ===
The First MicroFinance Bank of Afghanistan was founded in 2003 and became one of the first banks to fall under Afghanistan's legal framework on microfinance. FMFB-A opened its first branch in Kabul in May 2004, with KfW Banking Group and the International Finance Corporation as shareholders. The microfinance market was estimated at over 303,000 clients at the end of 2009, which is still only 18 percent of the two million households living below the poverty line in the country. FMFB-A is currently the largest microfinance institution in Afghanistan in terms of outstanding portfolio size, with US$45.7 million in 2010 in microfinance loans compared to US$39.8 million in 2009. Of the total portfolio, 31 percent of the client base is rural. The institution's rural portfolio represents 13,490 loans disbursed, valued at US$22 million. FMFB-A's has a network of 45 branches, 17 of which are in rural areas, covering 14 provinces.

=== Kyrgyzstan ===
The First MicroCredit Company (FMCC), which was launched as a microfinance program in 2003, was established in its present form as a microcredit company in 2006. It is the largest microfinance provider in the southern region of the Kyrgyz Republic. Over 950,000 people, or 65 percent of the population, work in the agrarian sector, and 44 percent of people in the Kyrgyz Republic work on family farms. The number of FMCC loans outstanding totaled over 11,980 at the end of 2009. This is a 21 percent increase over 2008. About 41 percent of the beneficiaries of the loan portfolio were women. Adding up all of the clients, the loans disbursed were valued at more than US$13.2 million.

=== Pakistan ===
The First MicroFinance Bank-Pakistan (FMFB-P) was the first bank to be licensed in Pakistan in March 2002 under the country's new microfinance regulatory framework. It initially began as a program in Rawalpindi and Karachi in 2002. In 2009, FMFB-P saw a 20 percent increase in its number of loan beneficiaries as well as a 30 percent increase in the number of savers. FMFB-P finished 2010 with over 206,000 outstanding loans valued at US$33.3 million. A quarter of FMFB-P's microcredit beneficiaries are women. More than 180,000 savings clients had deposited over US$40 million with the bank by the end of the year. Drawing on other work done on client needs research, FMFB-P and Harvard University started the development of social performance indicators to understand the needs of urban and rural clients so that they can develop products to better serve their clients.

=== Tajikistan ===
Tajikistan is one of the least developed of the 15 former Soviet republics, partially due to limited employment possibilities in the country. The First MicroFinance Bank-Tajikistan (FMFB-T) received its banking license and commenced operations as a microfinance bank in July 2004. FMFB-T is currently one of two microfinance banks in the country, along with numerous microfinance institutions. Around 350,000 households are estimated to be living below the poverty line, out of which it is estimated that 127,000 households had access to microfinance services at the end of December 2010. At the end of 2009, FMFB-T had 11,705 outstanding loans with a total value of $20.3 million.

=== Egypt ===
The First MicroFinance Foundation (FMF) was established in 2005 and was able to maintain a portfolio at risk in line with worldwide best practices, achieving 98 percent operational sustainability. FMF reached nearly 19,000 beneficiaries in 2009, with outstanding loans totaling US$4.5 million. The proportion of women borrowers has been maintained at 45 percent. Demand for microfinance is estimated at 20 million households, and only one million of those households are currently being served by existing microfinance entities. A small and medium enterprise department at FMF, which was piloted in May 2009, has financed a number of businesses in Darb al-Ahmar, one of the poorest areas in Cairo.

=== Syria ===
The First MicroFinance Institution Syria (FMFI-S) was established as a program in March 2003 and was the first private-sector microfinance service provider in Syria. In 2009, the institution was transformed into a regulated non-bank financial institution under the new Syrian microfinance law. This allowed it to invite other shareholders, such as IFC, KfW, and EIB, and mobilize deposits from the public. At the end of 2010, FMFI-S had an outstanding portfolio of 20,004 loans valued at US$21.3 million.

=== West Africa ===
The Première Agence de Microfinance (PAMF) was established in 2006 to serve Mali, Burkina Faso, and Côte d'Ivoire. The number of loans disbursed in these three countries was about 32,000 in 2009. This represents a 27 percent increase compared to 2008. The value of outstanding loans was over US$4.4 million, up from US$3.4 million in 2008. Women made up 46 percent of borrowers. Deposits increased over 2008, up 50 percent in number to just over 10,000, more than doubling in value to US$722,000. Currently, PAMF's activities are overwhelmingly concentrated in rural areas and on rural products. About 85 percent of loans in the region are disbursed from rural branches. The PAMF microfinance institutions offer credit for cereal commercialization, horticulture, animal fattening, and alternatives to cotton growing.

=== East Africa ===
In East Africa, AKAM's primary objective is to provide loans to microenterprises and small businesses for income-generating activities such as small-scale agriculture, fishing, and retail. AKAM's East African institutions disbursed about 8,640 loans in 2009, with 45 percent of the beneficiaries being women. The value of outstanding loans exceeded US$1.8 million. Two new branches were opened in Chiure, Mozambique, and Zanzibar, Tanzania, which brought AKAM's presence in the region to 10 branches in three countries—the third being Kenya.

=== Madagascar ===
The Première Agence de MicroFinance in Madagascar (PAMF-Madagascar) was established in December 2006 as a credit institution, with the first four branches established in the region of Sofia, a rural area in the north of Madagascar. In late 2008, PAMF-Madagascar became a microfinance institution. It began taking deposits in July 2009. Today, PAMF-Madagascar has 11 branches in five regions of Madagascar (Sofia, Analamanga, Boeny, Diana, and Itasy), and it now operates in both rural and urban areas. At the end of 2009, over 9,500 outstanding loans were distributed by PAMF-Madagascar. These totaled over US$1.8 million and over 1,100 savers deposited with PAMF-Madagascar.

== Programmes, initiatives and services ==
=== Housing loans ===
One of the key priorities for the agency was the development of a housing portfolio and methodology throughout six countries. Many of AKAM's institutions offer loans for the refurbishment and renovation of homes. By providing credit to poor families to restore and upgrade their homes, AKAM institutions are contributing to genuine improvements in the quality of life of their constituents.

In Afghanistan, the First MicroFinance Bank (FMFB-A) piloted a habitat improvement product in 2008. With the support of the IFC, a housing microfinance loan product was developed.

As of December 2010, FMFB-A had 5,003 outstanding housing improvement loans and an outstanding total housing loan portfolio of US$6,759,010. This product is available in 21 urban branches, and now FMFB-A is looking at adapting the product for rural areas by conducting a rural demand and repayment capacity survey to develop the most suitable product for these areas.

In collaboration with the Aga Khan Planning and Building Services, Pakistan, and the Aga Khan Foundation USA, along with a grant from the United States Agency for International Development, FMFB-A will be providing construction advisory services in 2011.

In 2010, the agencies took the first step and developed guidelines for the construction and retrofitting of non-engineered buildings. Based on those standards, FMFB-A will provide construction appraisal and advisory services and promote innovative housing upgrades.

Construction advisory services consider a number of factors. These include site and construction material selection and construction design with regards to disaster mitigation, particularly in earthquake-prone areas, and material selection and construction design with regards to sustainability, energy efficiency, sanitation, and other health aspects. If these factors are taken into consideration, the housing infrastructure that is insufficient in both quantity and quality can be improved.

=== Small and Medium Enterprise (SME) loans ===
Small and medium enterprises are often referred to as the "missing middle" in developing country economies. While individual microenterprises help to sustain and support the core livelihoods of families and households and are central to improving quality of life and alleviating poverty, SME activity is at the heart of growth, sustaining jobs and employment creation for all, including youth and disadvantaged individuals.

Additionally, the job creation element of SMEs can enable many poor people to feel more secure because SME loans provide a mechanism to smooth incomes so that SMEs can employ and pay monthly salaries. Through its SME lending, AKAM aims to stimulate sustainable employment to promote economic development and poverty alleviation. AKAM also supports investment in community services for broader improvements, such as improved access to health care and education and upgrades in the built environment.

In 2008, based on the success in Afghanistan, the first institution to offer SME loans, AKAM launched a pilot of a similar SME initiative in Egypt, which added an integrated in-house business development services component provided directly by AKAM's microfinance institution in Egypt.

On average, SMEs are responsible for the creation of around 20 full-time and part-time jobs per business. This provides the poor with a way to maintain or improve their quality of life in the face of uncertainty. Moreover, gaining access to financial services is a critical step in connecting the poor to a broader economic life and building their confidence so that they can play a role in the larger community.

=== Call centre ===
At the First MicroFinance Institution Syria (FMFI-S), it was found that, aside from the branch network, FMFI-S had no other channels in place to sell its products and/or services to its clients. The institution decided that the setup of a call center would improve its service and eventually its outreach. International best practices have also shown that for the microfinance client target group, this channel can be very successful and cost-effective.

Some seven million Syrians, or about 38 percent of the country's population, have a mobile phone. This makes getting in touch with clients and others who have shown an interest in getting a microfinance loan easier. With the help of the Frankfurt School of Finance & Management, FMFI-S started the process of improving customer service by upgrading the staff's skills and reducing loan approval time. To ensure that the clients were getting the best possible service, FMFI-S established a call center to handle customer complaints, customer queries, or to get information to dormant clients or to people referred by other clients.

The call center handles product issues, including promotional campaigns. This call center also allows the institution to diversify and expand the SME client base using lower-cost solutions than the expansion of the branch network.

By the end of 2010, seven outbound campaigns had been executed. The result of this campaign was that 32 percent of those who were called had a conversation with an FMFI-S staff member. Of this 32 percent, about 10 percent went into a branch and got a loan. Although the actual outreach through the call center only equaled three percent of total loans disbursed, this is expected to increase in the coming months. All branches have anecdotally noticed that the call center has played a role in attracting new clients. Though there is an increased traffic burden on the branches, the call center has contributed to the increasing number of visitors (potential clients) in the Damascus and Masyaf branches.

=== Agricultural lending ===
Given the scarce access to financial services among the rural poor and the importance of agriculture as a critical livelihood activity, agricultural finance is a key focus area for AKAM. Several of AKAM's institutions, particularly in sub-Saharan Africa, Pakistan, the Kyrgyz Republic, and Tajikistan, have significant rural outreach and agriculture portfolios, but the unmet demand is still vast. Where there are sister agencies, AKAM's entities collaborate to help increase the farmers’ yield. PAMF Madagascar's focus is to expand outreach in rural areas where the microfinance penetration rate is extremely low—currently at around 3.5 percent—and where poverty is high. Consequently, 62 percent of its loans are rural. Although agriculture is a mainstay of the economy, employing 80 percent of the population, access to agricultural finance is low, particularly among PAMF-Mada's focus areas of Sofia and Itasy.

The focus of PAMF-Mada's initial rural expansion has been small agricultural loans; in 2010, 48 percent of the loan disbursements were for agriculture. PAMF Madagascar also collaborates with AKF to provide loans to rice farmers organized and trained by AKF in improved cultivation practices. To continue to support its target market, PAMF Madagascar expects small agricultural loans to remain an important share of its lending activity. However, to support growth in agriculture more broadly, increase impact, and support sustainability, PAMF Madagascar plans to introduce an agricultural SME product to develop appropriate financial services for other actors and gaps in the rice value chain in particular.

In the Kyrgyz Republic, the First MicroCredit Company (FMCC) is the largest microfinance provider in the southern region of the country. Given FMCC's mandate to target the poor and underserved, it maintains a strong rural and agricultural focus, with agricultural and livestock loans representing 73 percent of disbursements by number in 2010. The Kyrgyz Republic's agricultural products include cotton, vegetables, and fruits. As far as total production, the largest crop is assorted types of animal fodder to feed livestock. The second largest crop is winter wheat, followed by barley, corn, and rice. Animal husbandry is the main economic input in the mountainous regions, and so sheep, goats, cattle, and wool are popular products to sell, as are chickens, horses, pigs, and in some areas, yaks. This means that not all clients will be equally affected by weather conditions or disease outbreaks.
