= Aga Khan University Hospital, Karachi =

Hospital in Karachi, Pakistan

Coordinates: 24.8933°N 67.0744°E

Aga Khan University Hospital
- Aga Khan Health Services

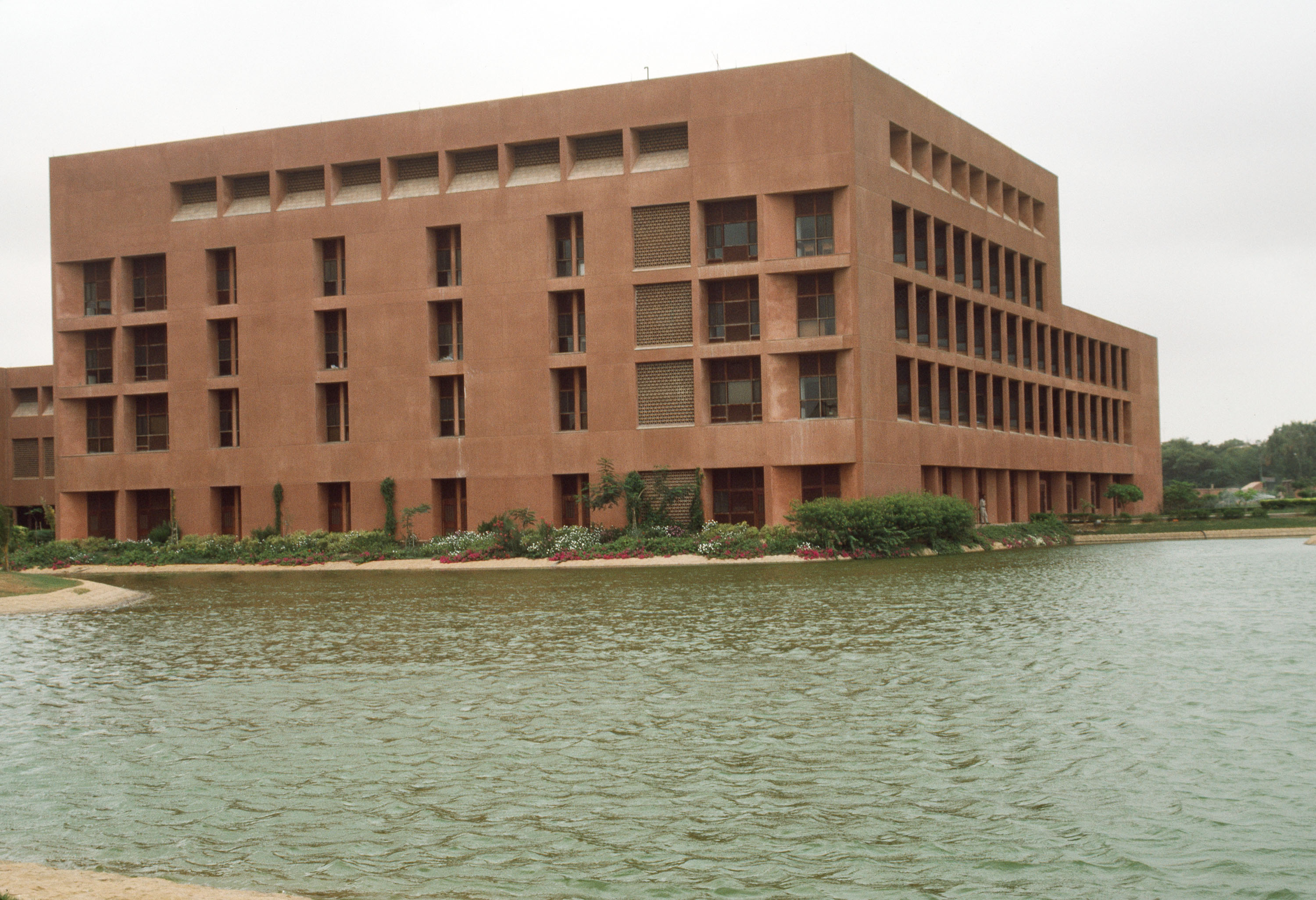
- Aga Khan University Hospital, Karachi

Geography
- Location: Karachi, Sindh, Pakistan

Organisation
- Care system: Private
- Type: Teaching
- Affiliated university: College of Physicians and Surgeons of Pakistan; Aga Khan University
- Patron: Chancellor - His Highness Prince Rahim Aga Khan, V Pro-Chancellor - Princess Zahra Aga Khan

History
- Founded: 1985

Links
- Website: https://hospitals.aku.edu/Pakistan/Pages/default.aspx
- Lists: Hospitals in Pakistan

The Aga Khan University Hospital (AKUH) is a private hospital in Karachi, Pakistan. Established in 1985, it is the primary academic medical centre of the Aga Khan University. The hospital provides quaternary care, including multidisciplinary care across all clinical specialities.

== History ==
Aga Khan University Hospital was established in 1985 with a US$300 million investment from Prince Karim Aga Khan. The government of Muhammad Zia-ul-Haq provided 33.9 hectares (84 acres) in the heart of Karachi for the University Hospital at no cost.

== Facilities ==
The Aga Khan University Hospital (AKUH) is a 720-bed quaternary care teaching hospital in Karachi, Pakistan. It provides all services under one roof. The hospital offers 96 private rooms, 210 semi-private rooms, 171 general ward beds, 166 special care beds, and 77 intensive care beds across its Intensive Care Unit (ICU), Coronary Care Unit (CCU), Neonatal Intensive Care Unit (NICU) and Paediatric Intensive Care Unit (PICU). In 2019, the hospital expanded its private facilities with the opening of the Princess Zahra Pavilion, oncampus.

AKUH has 17 main operating theatres, two labour and delivery operating theatres and four day-care operating theatres where day-care surgery services, including minimally invasive surgeries are offered. The hospital offers a range of diagnostic and support services, including radiology (including nuclear medicine), laboratory medicine, pharmacy, cardiopulmonary services, neurophysiology, and physiotherapy and rehabilitation medicine.

The AKUH Clinical Laboratories operate a nationwide network of 300+ specimen collection centres across 100+ cities in Pakistan. AKUH Clinical Laboratories are accredited by the College of American Pathologists (CAP), while the Hospital and Outreach Services are accredited by Joint Commission International (JCI).

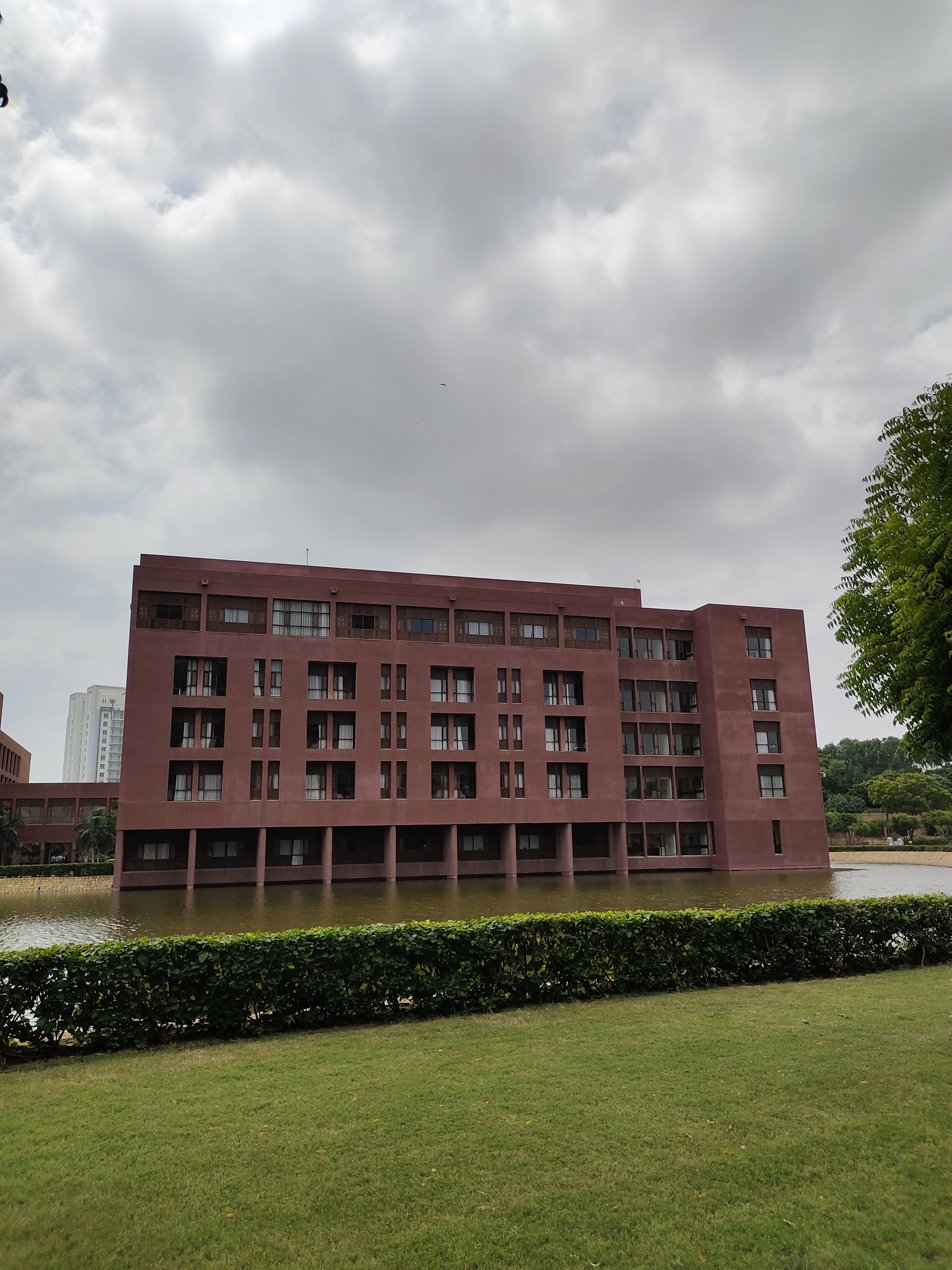
The newly constructed Private Wing

== Architecture ==
The Aga Khan Medical Complex, built in Karachi, was planned and designed by Payette Associates, a Boston, U.S.-based architectural firm. It consists of a 720-bed hospital, a medical school for 500 students, a school of nursing and midwifery, a school of arts and sciences, housing for staff and students, and other amenities. The campus has been carefully designed to take into account the history, climate, environment, symbolism and the spiritual values of the Muslim culture.

== Accreditation ==
Aga Khan University Hospital, Karachi is a Joint Commission International (JCI) accredited hospital.

This hospital is also accredited by the College of Physicians and Surgeons of Pakistan.

Its Clinical Laboratories are also accredited by the College of American Pathologists (CAP).

== See also ==
- Aga Khan Development Network
- Aga Khan University
