= Aga Khan Agency for Habitat =

Habitat and disaster preparedness agency in Asia

- Abbreviation: AKAH
- Formation: 2016
- Headquarters: 1-3 Avenue de la Paix, 1202 Geneva, Switzerland
- Region served: South Asia; Central Asia; Middle East
- Affiliations: Aga Khan Development Network
- Website: AKAH

The Aga Khan Agency for Habitat (AKAH) was established in 2016 and is part of the Aga Khan Development Network (AKDN). It is an umbrella of AKDN agencies and programs that have provided aid and delivered training on habitat and disaster preparedness since the 1990s.

The former Aga Khan Planning and Building Service, Pakistan (AKBPSP) is now known as Aga Khan Agency for Habitat. Pakistan.

== History and purpose ==
AKAH operates in Afghanistan, Tajikistan, Syria, Pakistan and India. It bridges various AKDN initiatives, including Focus Humanitarian Assistance, and the Aga Khan Planning and Building Services.

The Agency has provided emergency aid to communities who have suffered the consequences of hurricanes, cyclones, avalanches, tsunamis, flooding, earthquakes and civil conflict. It also works alongside communities occupying high-risk areas to safety plan by providing preparation and response training on natural and man-made disasters, as well as the effects of climate change.

Michael Kocher currently serves as General Manager of the Agency.

AKAH advocates for equitable access to safe physical settings with reduced exposure to the effects of natural disasters regardless of socioeconomic status. To allow for progression and an improved quality of life, the Agency also ensures that these settings are equipped with accessible social and financial resources.

== Disaster preparedness and response ==
AKAH trains volunteer teams to warn and safely evacuate people before disasters strike and respond with first aid, search and rescue, and emergency relief post-disaster.

These volunteers are called Community Emergency Response Teams (CERTs). Presently, a network of 162 CERTs and 36,000 volunteers serve as first responders. More than 50% of the volunteers are women.

In response to disasters, emergency survival relief consists of safe drinking water, temporary shelter, nutritional food, clothing, blankets and basic household items.

The Agency has distributed food and established rehabilitation camps to be used as quarantine sites within the geographic regions it operates in as a response to the impacts of the COVID-19 pandemic.

== Water and sanitation ==
To aid with access to clean water and sanitation, AKAH collaborates with local communities through the Water and Sanitation Extension Programme (WASEP), a flagship programme that has been in operation since 1997. More than 500,000 people have benefitted from the building of the water supply systems.

== Safe and sustainable construction ==
After consultation with local communities, the Agency has pooled resources with the Harvard University Graduate School of Design for solutions to design and construct green, energy-efficient and seismically resilient structures.
