= Aga Khan Health Services =

Health agency based in France

- Abbreviation: AKHS
- Formation: 1920
- Affiliations: Aga Khan Development Network
- Website: AKHS

The Aga Khan Health Services is an agency of the Aga Khan Development Network (AKDN) that supports activities in the health field, and manages more than 200 health facilities, including a network of Aga Khan Hospitals.

It works closely with the Aga Khan Foundation (AKF) and the Aga Khan University (AKU) on planning, training, and resource development, and with the Aga Khan Education Services (AKES) and the Aga Khan Planning and Building Services (AKPBS) on the integration of health issues into specific projects.

With community health programmes in Central and South Asia, as well as East Africa, AKHS is one of the most comprehensive private not-for-profit health care systems in the developing world. It provides curative health care through 237 health centres, dispensaries, hospitals, diagnostic centres and community health outlets to one million beneficiaries and handles 1.2 million patient visits annually.

Building on the Ismaili Community's health care efforts in the first half of the 20th century, AKHS now provides primary health care and curative care in Afghanistan, India, Kenya, Pakistan, and Tanzania, and provides technical assistance to government in health service delivery in Kenya, Syria and Tajikistan.

== Programmes and major initiatives ==
AKHS's community health programmes are designed to reach vulnerable groups in society, especially child-bearing women and young children, with low-cost, proven medical technologies. In AKHS's approach to health services, primary health care and prevention are considered as steps towards improved health status that must be linked to the availability of high quality medical care. To complement its work in primary health care, AKHS offers curative services in institutions ranging from dispensaries through health centres to full-service hospitals. At each level of care, the AKHS focus is on providing services that are needed and wanted by the community and on building linkages within the system. It also aims to ensure a quality of care that significantly raises local standards. Quality control in laboratory diagnosis, appropriate documentation in medical records, regular supply of pharmaceuticals and continuing education of nurses and doctors are some of the practices that AKHS emphasises in its approach to institutional development.

AKHS's overall major initiatives include:

- Assisting communities to develop, manage, and sustain the health care they need.
- Providing accessible medical care in modern, efficient, and cost-effective facilities.
- Working in partnership with other agencies in the development of communities and the enhancement of their health.
- Educating physicians, nurses, and allied health professionals.
- Conducting research relevant to environments in which AKHS institutions exist.
- Contributing to the development of national and international health policy.

== Organization and governance ==
AKHS is organised into national service companies in Afghanistan, India, Kenya, Pakistan, Syria, Tajikistan, Tanzania, and Uganda registered as a not-for-profit, non-governmental agencies in their respective countries. Each company is sponsored by Aga Khan Health Services S.A., a not-for-profit organisation registered in Switzerland and has its own Chairman and Board of Directors.

The Social Welfare Department (SWD) located within the Secretariat of the Aga Khan in France, co-ordinates the activities of the service companies through planning, budget reviews, and the provision of technical assistance. They are also linked internationally through network-wide strategies in human resource development, hospital management, nursing development, and primary health care. While strengthening its institutions and the links between them, each health service company also joins government health services and other providers in building effective national health systems.

== See also ==
- Aga Khan Development Network
- Aga Khan Hospital (disambiguation)
- Prince Aly Khan Hospital
