= Aga Khan Education Services =

- Abbreviation: AKES
- Formation: 1905
- Founder: Aga Khan III
- Affiliations: Aga Khan Development Network
- Website: AKES

Aga Khan Education Services (AKES) is one of the agencies of the Aga Khan Development Network (AKDN) supporting activities in the field of education. The others are the Aga Khan Foundation (AKF), the Aga Khan University (AKU), the University of Central Asia (UCA), and the Aga Khan Trust for Culture (AKTC).

== History ==
In 1905, Aga Khan III started the Aga Khan School in Mundra, the first school what later became a large network of schools, AKES.

AKES currently operates more than 300 schools and advanced educational programmes that provide quality pre-school, primary, secondary, and higher secondary education services to more than 54,000 students in Pakistan, India, Bangladesh, Kenya, Uganda, Tanzania, and Tajikistan. AKES is also developing new schools in Kyrgyzstan and Madagascar and studying the feasibility of services and facilities in Mozambique.

=== AKES in Pakistan ===
The existence of AKES in Pakistan dates back to the late 1940s, before the establishment of formal AKDN agencies. His Highness the Aga Khan's grandfather, Sir Sultan Mohamed Shah, created literacy centres for girls in remote villages situated in the Karakorum Mountains. Diamond Jubilee Schools for girls were established in Northern Pakistan and Chitral district in 1946 to commemorate Sir Sultan Mohamed Shah's sixty years as the spiritual leader of the Ismaili community.

The AKES has helped to provide easy access to education in remote areas of Pakistan, with special emphasis given to the education of girls in the northern areas. As of 2007, AKES operates 191 schools with 37,285 students enrolled. It believes that all children should have access to good schools, teachers and learning resources. Most of the Aga Khan Schools in Pakistan provide pre-school, primary and secondary education.

==== Northern Pakistan Education Programme (NPEP) ====
AKES implements or funds education programmes aimed at improving access and quality of primary and secondary education. One of the programmes they have implemented is the Northern Pakistan Education Programme in 1997, a joint partnership between AKES and the European Commission. The programme had helped to increase accessibility of primary and secondary education by funding schools to help them increase their intake of students, with 60% of the new vacancies going to girls as instructed. The programme ended in 2008, with 80% of the children in the region enrolled in primary schools and a significant number of them are girls.

==== Releasing Confidence and Creativity (RCC) ====
The program 'Releasing Confidence and Creativity (RCC): Building Sound Foundations for Early Learning in Pakistan', is being implemented in 100 government schools in Sindh and Balochistan, Pakistan. The programme focuses on early childhood development.

The programme aims to enhance the development of the staff and expansion of participation of parents and communities in their children's education. RCC also creates incentives and innovative models for investing in the school in order to improve the physical and learning environment. Lastly, it encourages community mobilisation and training to increase participation of parents, communities, NGOs and private sector in public schools.

According to an evaluation report done by USAID, children involved in RCC have expressed that they enjoyed the RCC programme. Home visits under RCC helped reduce absenteeism and increase enrolment in schools. It was also reported that the programme has generally increased enrolment and children's interests in school. Data have also shown that 90% of children that have participated in RCC have gone on to grade one of elementary school.

== Early childhood education ==
The early childhood education programme, available across the AKES network, emphasises "child initiated learning". Children are encouraged to plan and construct their own learning, thereby retaining their natural self-confidence.

== Aga Khan Schools ==
There are more than 240 schools running under Aga Khan Education Services. These schools are located across the globe in following countries Pakistan, India, Bangladesh, Kenya, Kyrgyzstan, Uganda, Tanzania and Tajikistan. These schools include pre-primary, primary, secondary and higher secondary schools.

These schools have banner names of Diamond Jubilee schools, Aga Khan Schools and Aga Khan Higher Secondary Schools.
