= Aga Khan Development Network =

Network of development agencies founded by the Aga Khan

- Abbreviation: AKDN
- Formation: 1967
- Headquarters: Av. de la Paix 1, 1202 Genève, Switzerland
- Coordinates: 46.2238°N 6.1482°E
- Region served: Asia and Africa
- Chairman: Aga Khan V
- Website: AKDN

The Aga Khan Development Network (AKDN) is a network of private, non-denominational development agencies founded by the Aga Khan, with the primary focus of improving the quality of life in different regions of Asia and Africa.

The network focuses on health, education, culture, rural development, institution building, and economic development. AKDN's mission includes improving living conditions and opportunities for the poor without regard to faith, origin, or gender. While the agencies are secular, they follow Islamic values.

== AKDN agencies ==
AKDN agencies' mission statement is to work towards the elimination of global poverty; the promotion and implementation of pluralism; the advancement of the status of women; and the honoring of Islamic art and architecture. To pursue their mandates, AKDN institutions rely on volunteers as well as paid staff.

As of 2026, the organization's annual budget for not-for-profit activities is approximately $1.3 billion, mainly in Africa, Asia, and the Middle East. AKDN works in 30 countries around the world, and it employs approximately 96,000 paid staff.

The following is a list of AKDN agencies:

AKAH	Aga Khan Agency for Habitat
AKAM	Aga Khan Agency for Microfinance
AKS	Aga Khan Schools
AKF	Aga Khan Foundation
AKFED	Aga Khan Fund for Economic Development
AKHS	Aga Khan Health Services
AKTC	Aga Khan Trust for Culture
AKU	Aga Khan University
UCA	University of Central Asia

The Aga Khan Fund for Economic Development and its affiliates, Tourism Promotion Services, Industrial Promotion Services, and the Aga Khan Agency for Microfinance, seek to strengthen the role of the private sector in developing countries by supporting private sector initiatives in the development process. The fund and the foundation also encourage government policies that foster what the Aga Khan first called "an enabling environment of favorable legislative and fiscal structures".

AKDN also runs civil society programs. A number of their organizations are sponsored by the World Bank with the help of partner foundations.

The Aga Khan Trust for Culture coordinates the Imamate's cultural activities. Its programs include the Aga Khan Award for Architecture, the Aga Khan Historic Cities Program, and the Education and Culture Program. The trust also provides financial support for the Aga Khan Program for Islamic Architecture at Harvard University and the Massachusetts Institute of Technology in the United States. It also supports cultural development and preservation with the Award for Architecture, Aga Khan Trust for Culture (AKTC), Historic Cities, Museums & Exhibitions, Islamic Architecture and Music.

The Aga Khan Fund for Economic Development (AKFED), Aga Khan Agency for Microfinance (AKAM), Financial Services, Industrial Promotion, Tourism Promotion, Media, Aviation Services are some agencies and programs offered for economic development.

In the field of education, AKDN has the Aga Khan Education Services (AKES), Aga Khan University (AKU), Aga Khan Academies (AKA), and the University of Central Asia (UCA).

== Rural development ==
In Gilgit-Baltistan, Pakistan, the Aga Khan Foundation is employed to improve residents' standards of living.

The Aga Khan Foundation (AKF) works to mitigate educational and food scarcity in several disadvantaged East African communities. The AKF has partnered with organizations in rural regions of Kenya and Tanzania to augment their economic capacity. Programs in Kenya have built over 120 dams and small farm reservoirs to increase water accessibility, along with water pipes for schools and hospitals. Programs in Tanzania have focused on helping to train farmers on sustainable agricultural practices to battle harsh and unpredictable climate.

== Philosophy of AKDN ==
Aga Khan V, AKDN's Chair, succeeded to the office of the 50th hereditary Imam as spiritual and administrative leader of the Shia faith-rooted Nizari Isma'ili Muslim faith on 4 February 2025. Ismailis consist of an estimated 25 to 30 million adherents (about 5% of the world's Shia Muslim population).

The Aga Khan Development Network states that its mandate is to improve the quality of life for the most vulnerable. This mandate guides the network of AKDN institutions active in more than 30 underdeveloped countries to provide support in the fields of health care, education, and economics.

The functions and philosophy of the Aga Khan Development Network (AKDN) according to the organisation are quoted below:

"The engagement of the Imamat in development is guided by Islamic ethics, which bridge faith and society. It is on this premise that I established the Aga Khan Development Network. This Network of agencies, known as the AKDN, has long been active in many areas of Asia and Africa to improve the quality of life of all who live there. These areas are home to some of the poorest and most diverse populations in the world."

— Aga Khan IV Keynote address at the Governor General's Canadian Leadership Conference, 9 May 2004

== Partners ==
The AKDN partners with like-minded institutions in the design, implementation, and funding of innovative development projects. Partners included governments of many nations: Afghanistan, Australia, Bangladesh, Canada, Côte d'Ivoire, Czech Republic, Democratic Republic of the Congo, Denmark, Egypt, Finland, France, Germany, Greece, India, Japan, Kazakhstan, Kenya, Kyrgyzstan, Malaysia, Mali, Mozambique, Netherlands, New Zealand, Norway, Pakistan, Portugal, Spain, Sweden, Switzerland, Syria, Tajikistan, Tanzania, Zanzibar, Uganda, United Kingdom, and the United States.

The AKDN is one of the first Global Alliance Founding Partners, that provides funding for the Earthshot Prize, launched in October 2020 by Prince William in partnership with Sir David Attenborough through The Royal Foundation. Between 2021 and 2030, five prizes of £1 million will be awarded annually to recipients who identify solutions to global environmental problems.
