= Haji Bibi case =

1908 Indian court case on the Nizari Ismaili succession

Haji Bibi v. His Highness Sir Sultan Mohamed Shah, the Aga Khan, often referred to as the Haji Bibi Case, was a 1908 court case in the Bombay High Court heard by Justice Russell. The case was fundamentally a dispute over the inheritance of the estate of Hasan Ali Shah, a Persian nobleman with the title Aga Khan I and the hereditary leader (46th Imam) of the Nizari Ismailis. A number of the properties and other monetary assets had been passed down to Aqa Ali Shah, Aga Khan II and then to his grandson, Sir Sultan Muhammad Shah, Aga Khan III. The plaintiffs included Haji Bibi who was a widowed granddaughter of Aga Khan I and a few other members of the family that all claimed rights to the wealth. The decision is notable as it confirmed the Aga Khan III's exclusive rights to the assets of his grandfather and to the continued religious offerings by his followers, including some Khojas, as the 48th Imam of the Nizaris.

As part of the adjudication, the British judge extensively examined the religious identity of the Khoja community in India. The plaintiffs argued that the family was Ithnā‘ashari (Twelver), and under the corresponding Muhammadan customs of inheritance, they were obligated to shares. However, after considering the religious customs of the Khojas including the ginans, Justice Russell concluded that the community was Shia Imami Ismaili Muslims, now known as Nizari Ismailis. Furthering the 1866 decision in the Aga Khan case, this tradition was differentiated from both Sunnis and Ithnā‘asharis.

== Historical background ==
Before the arrival of the British in the Indian subcontinent, the Khojas had a pluralistic character and used multilingual discourses to address their faith. The community had been converted by a number of Nizari Ismaili pirs and sayyids since the 11th century, of whom Pir Sadruddin and his son Pir Hasan Kabiruddin are often seen as the most influential and successful missionaries. However, the collection of their teachings was referred to as satpanth, ‘the true path,’ and the group did not self-identify as Ismaili, Muslim, or even Hindu. Rather, traditions were adopted from all three, and the Khjoas expressed their beliefs in terms of concepts and formulations. For example, the satpanth tradition venerated `A True Guide` that lived in the West that could have been interpreted as either the Nizari Imams or the 10th incarnation of Vishnu. This unique set of beliefs not only baffled outsiders such as the British legislature, but it also led to internal confusion within the community.

Since the Alamut period, the Nizari Imams had been settled within Persia. Although they often received religious offerings from their followers in the Indian subcontinent, there was little done to label the satpanth as Ismailis / Nizaris or unify the community under the Imam's authority. Aga Khan I was similarly born in Persia, but due to conflict with the ruling Qajar government, was forced to flee in 1841. He eventually settled in Bombay in 1848 where he proceeded to assert his authority on all sorts of issues related to the large Khoja population, including controlling the communally owned property. While a number of the Khojas accepted the Aga Khan I as their new leader, a number of dissenters challenged his authority in what is now known as the Aga Khan case of 1866. The decision by Sir Joseph Arnould concluded that the Khoja were Shia Muslim and not Sunni, with the hereditary line leading to Aga Khan I as their rightful leaders.

It is also important to note that the Aga Khan I's move to India did not just involve one individual. Rather, the movement involved thousands of persons affiliated with his institution, including extended family, servants, scribes, and private military forces. Upon moving, he used his property, allowances from the government of Rs 3000, and continued religious dues from the Khoja community to establish a presence in Bombay through a number of properties and care for his extended family. This would become one of the central issues in the Haji Bibi case. Did the Aga Khan care for his extended family out of his personal goodwill or out of some other obligation?

== Arguments and evidence ==
Justice Russell's decision in The Bombay Law Reporter notes that as many as 128 claims were brought up by the prosecution. Generally, these issues fell under 4 umbrellas. Below we analyze both the plaintiffs and defendants arguments:

=== 1. Intention of religious offerings ===
- The plaintiff contended that the religious offerings made by the Khoja community were intended to be shared with the extended family of the current Imam. She cited various ginans which say that payments should be made to the ‘Aal Ali’ or ‘Aulad Ali’ which was interpreted to mean the progeny of the Ali and Imams. Various Quranic verses also support payments to the family. The evidence for this argument was that the family of the Aga Khan often collected the religious offerings or partook in various ceremonies where they received gifts.
- However, to counter this point the defense brought in Vazir Cassum Ismail, who argued that those expressions specifically referred to the descent of Ali, “who is on the gadi of the Imam” i.e., the seat of the Imamat. Also, the Quranic verses referred only to spoils of war and not to the Khoja religious offerings. A number of other witnesses also noted that they did not know of the Aga Khan's family and sent offerings for him to use however he saw fit.

=== 2. Inheritance and religion of the Khojas ===
- Although the Aga Khan case concluded that the Khojas were Shia, it was still unclear what system of beliefs that they follow. Haji Bibi and her counsel argued that the Imams and the Khoja had always been Ithna’ashari (Twelvers). Then, by the Muhammadan Law of Inheritance, the extended family was to inherit shares of the late Aga Khan I's assets. As evidence, Haji Bibi cited that they had been able to live rent-free in some house of the family estate as proof of their status heirs or heiresses.
- To counter this point, the defense pointed to the Du’a (daily ritual prayer) of the Khoja community which lists the hereditary successorship through Imam Ismail all the way to Sir Sultan Muhammad Shah, Aga Khan III. Furthermore, through an analysis of the ginans of Pir Sadruddin and Kabirudin as well as the customary practices of the Khoja, Justice Russell concluded the community was clearly Shia Imami Ismaili, and they follow the Aga Khan as their Imam.

=== 3. Release of the estate ===
- The executor of the estate of Aga Khan I and Aga Khan II, named Shamsudin, was the administrator of the estate of both Jungi Shah and Sultan Muhammad Shah. The plaintiff posited that release of the estate was a sham transaction brought about by collusion or fraud on the part by the defendant.
- In contrast, the defense argued that the Aga Khan III had been within his rights during the release of the estates, and in fact, he had been more than generous to his extended family. The evidence included an analysis of legal documents and events leading to the inheritance.

=== 4. Murder of Hassan Shah and Jungi Shah ===
- The plaintiff argued that the murders both occurred after a rise of disputes within the family and points to Sir Sultan Muhammad Shah's unwillingness to investigate.
- However, the Aga Khan was not in town at the time of either murder and was in both cases not thought to be involved until this inheritance court case. For example, there had been no animosity towards him at his marriage to Jungi Shah's daughter.

One issue with the current primary source literature is that the Aga Khan III's defense is not fully available due to the public. Arguing that the testimony would lead to conflict within the community, the defense counsel asked for the judge to clear the court. Justice Russell permitted this request, and although the private evidence was used in the adjudication, it was expunged from all public records.

== Legal decisions ==
1. Justice Russell found that the religious offerings were made out of “deep vernation and reverence” for the Imam and were made for him to use as he saw fit.
2. The Khoja followers of Aga Khan III were defined to be Shia Imami Ismailis, a group different from both the Sunnis and Twelver Shias.
3. Justice Russell sides with the defense and argued that Sir Sultan Muhammad Shah had been generous to his extended family and did not commit fraudulent activity to claim the assets of the Aga Khan family.
4. The judge found these accusations to have no foundation and concluded that they should have never been made.

== Impact ==
As a case generally around inheritance within the Aga Khan family, the decision by Justice Russell immediately concluded the rights of the Sir Sultan Muhammad Shah, Aga Khan III to the assets of family assets accrued by his grandfather and father. More broadly, the Haji Bibi case furthered defined the religious identity of the Khoja followers of the Aga Khan as Shia Imami Ismailis, distinct from both the Sunnis and Ithna’asharis. This label would become a primary marker of identity, and over time, many of the practices of the Khojas would change to remove some of the Hindu or Indic elements to better match the Muslim community.

A response given by the Aga Khan during this case regarding the origin of his followers is significant. In addition to enumerating his followers in Iran, Russia, Afghanistan, Central Asia, Syria and other places, he also noted that “In Hindustan and Africa there are many Guptis who believe in me…I consider them Shi’i Imami Ismailis; by caste they are Hindus”. This serves as an important example where the Imam recognizes the Gupti community, who were practicing pious circumspection (taqiyya) at the time, as his Ismaili followers.

During the Imamate of Aga Khan III, the Nizaris would grow in prominence and followers. The Imam would play a significant role in the independence movement from Britain as well as the formation of Pakistan.

== See also ==
- Satpanth
- Aga Khan I
- Aga Khan II
- Aga Khan III
