= Aga Khan case =

1866 legal case in India

The Aga Khan case was an 1866 court decision in the High Court of Bombay by Justice Sir Joseph Arnould that established the authority of the first Aga Khan, Hasan Ali Shah, as the head of the Khoja community of Bombay.

The case was officially a property dispute between a subset of dissident leaders of the Bombay Khojas and the Aga Khan, a Persian nobleman who had arrived in Bombay (now Mumbai) in 1846 and was regarded by his followers, including most Khojas, as their rightful leader and the 46th imam of the Nizari Ismaili Muslims. The dissidents rejected the Aga Khan's claim on authority by arguing that he was not a Khoja and that the Khojas had always been Sunni Muslims.

As part of adjudicating the dispute, Arnould undertook an extensive examination of the religious background of the Khoja caste. After a 25-day trial, which included testimony from the Aga Khan and a review of numerous documents, Arnould found in favor of the Aga Khan, ruling that the Khojas were Shia Ismailis and that the Aga Khan was their rightful leader.

== Background ==
In 1847, an inheritance dispute between two Khoja brothers led to the first legal dispute between a group of Khoja leaders and the Aga Khan, with the parties asserting that the dispute should be decided by caste custom and Quranic law, respectively. Though the judge, Sir Erskine Perry, decided the case in favor of the Khoja leaders, his findings included the assertion that the Khojas were a “Muhammedian” group (one with primarily Hindu practices, according to Perry), and that the 14th century Ismaili da'i, Pir Sadruddin, had converted the Khojas to Islam.

By 1851, the Bombay Khoja community was divided into two camps: a minority that rejected the Aga Khan's authority and called for self-governance, and the majority that had been followers of the Aga Khan even before his arrival in India. After years of disagreements between the two sides—which were heightened when the Aga Khan asked Khojas to sign a document in 1861 prescribing the beliefs of the Nizaris, including loyalty to him—the dissident faction brought a case against the Aga Khan in 1866, seeking to overturn his claim as the community's leader.

In terms of legal and political context, the Aga Khan case came between two important events in the history of British India: the Rebellion of 1857 and the resulting Government of India Act, which led to the codification of the legal systems of the Bengal, Madras, and Bombay presidencies, and the first Indian census in 1871, which saw the formalization of religious and caste identities as categories of classification. Amid this context, Arnould asserted that the case hung on the question of the “original religion” of the Khojas, as this would determine their identity and thus their rightful leader.

== Trial ==
The plaintiffs formulated their case against the Aga Khan on religious grounds, arguing that the Khojas were Sunni Muslims, and that, as a result, the Aga Khan had no authority over the community.

The plaintiffs asked the court to take four steps in order to remove Aga Khan's authority and institute a system of self-governance: first, an accounting of all Khoja communal property in Bombay; second, the collection of all community property under the court's supervision; third, the institution of a regularized election procedure for selecting the leadership of the community; and fourth, an injunction prohibiting the Aga Khan from interfering in the community's property and affairs, influencing the election of the community's leadership, or asserting any power to excommunicate Khojas, deprive them of their privileges, or demand payments in a spiritual capacity.

The Aga Khan's attorneys made several claims, notably that the Khoja community had a long history of loyalty to the Aga Khan and his ancestors. They presented letters from as early as 1793 from the Aga Khan's father to the Khoja jamat in order to demonstrate that the Khojas had paid remittances to the Aga Khan and his ancestors. Further, the attorneys sought to invalidate the argument that the Khojas had been Sunni: they disassociated the Khojas from “classical Islam” by citing Perry's 1847 ruling that “they possessed no translation of the Koran,” and asserted that since they had been identified as “Muslim” by Perry, this indicated they were Shia, as Perry had called them “Hindus with a Muslim cultivation and Muslim development of their creed.”

The crucial piece of evidence proved to be an analysis of the Ismaili poem Dasavatar (“the Ten Avatars”). The poem, part of the Ismaili devotional hymns known as the ginans, is the work of Pir Sadruddin, the founder of the Khojas. While the first nine chapters of the ginan focus on Hindu avatars, the final chapter focuses on Ali (Muhammad’s son-in-law and the first imam in Shia Islam) and regards Ali as Nakalanki, the tenth avatar. The Aga Khan’s attorneys argued that Dasavatar, as both a uniquely Khoja and uniquely Ismaili work, was evidence of the Aga Khan’s previous connection with the Khojas via Pir Sadruddin.

== Decision ==
In reaching his decision, Arnould attempted to answer five distinct yet related questions: first, who are the Sunni and Shia Muslims in relation to one another; second, who are the Shia Ismailis; third, who is the Aga Khan; fourth, who are the Khojas in general and what is their relationship to the Aga Khan; and fifth, what is the relationship between the dissident Khojas and the Aga Khan?

Arnould’s judgment answered these questions one at a time.

First, he argued that Sunnis were the "orthodox Mussulmans", as the Shia put Ali on almost equal position with Muhammad. Yet, Arnould favored the Shia interpretation of the issue of succession and wrote positively of Shia history in general. Second, Arnould wrote at length about persecution against the Ismailis; the concept of taqiyya, or concealment of religious opinion and identity; and the history of the Assassins and the relationship of Hasan-i Sabbah and the Aga Khan. Third, Arnould asserted that while documentary gaps existed in the Aga Khan's claim to hereditary succession, he nevertheless agreed that the Aga Khan was a descendant, through Ali, of Muhammad.

Finally, Arnould turned to the questions of the Aga Khan's relationship to the Khoja community. First, Arnould ruled, the overwhelming majority of the Bombay Khojas had welcomed the Aga Khan and pledged allegiance to him, and that the Khojas had long made payments to him and his ancestors. Second, he said his decision hung on which form of Islam the Khojas had been converted to four hundred years previously. Arnould noted that Pir Sadruddin was an Ismaili missionary sent by one of the Aga Khan's ancestors, and accepted the defense's argument that Dasavatar was both a Khoja and an Ismaili text. Thus, Arnould concluded, the Khojas were Shia Ismaili, and the Aga Khan was their rightful leader.

== Effect ==
Arnould's judgment had the effect of ending serious challenges to the Aga Khan's rule. The Aga Khan administered the affairs of the Ismaili community, including the Khojas, until his death in 1881, when he was succeeded by his son, Aga Khan II, who served as imam for four years before his death and succession by his son, Aga Khan III.

During the long imamate of Aga Khan III (1885 to 1957), the Nizari Ismailis emerged as one of the most prominent Muslim groups in India. As a member of the All India Muslim League, Aga Khan III played a key role in the Indian independence movement and in the creation of Pakistan.

== See also ==
- Satpanth
