= Aga Khan's Maqbara =

Mausoleum in Mumbai, India

Aga Khan's Dargah
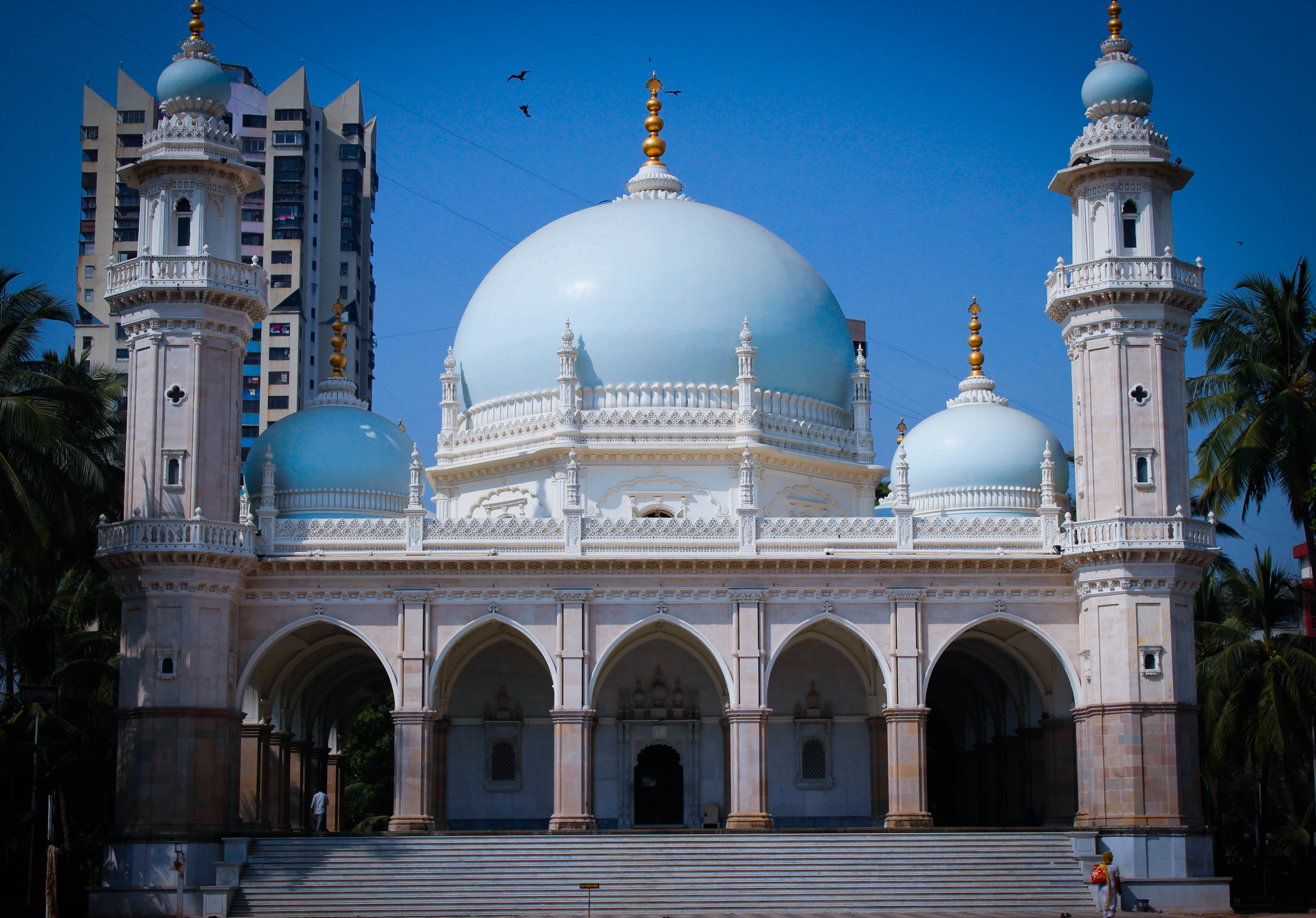
- Interactive map of Aga Khan's Dargah
- 18°58′24″N 72°50′22″E
- Location: Mumbai, Maharashtra, India

History
- Built: 1881–1884

Site notes
- Architect: Indo-Islamic

The Aga Khan's Maqbara or Aga Khan's Dargah is the mausoleum of Aga Khan I, located in Mazgaon, Mumbai, India. It is also known as the Hasanabad Monument since the personal name of Aga Khan I was Hasan.

Aga Khan I first visited the site in 1840. He was given a patch of land by Mukhi Ladakbhai Haji and stated his desire to be buried there when he died.

The construction of the mausoleum began in 1881 soon after the funeral of Aga Khan I; it was completed in 1884. The mausoleum is maintained by the jamaatkhana of the Khoja Muslims. It seems to have been inspired by the Taj Mahal. There are three blue domes and two 90-foot high minarets.

The mausoleum was the temporary resting place of the mortal remains of Aga Khan II until they were moved to Najaf, Iraq. It was also the temporary resting place of the mortal remains of Pir Abu'l-Hasan Shah until they were moved to Karbala, Iraq.

In the crypt of the mausoleum are buried two faithful servants of the Nizari imams:

- Wasir Rahim Basaria (January 1885 – 15 February 1927)
- Captain Aga Majid Khan (died 7 October 1956)

== See also ==
- Mausoleum of Aga Khan
