= Dar Tabligh =

Islamic organization based in Tanzania

Dar Tabligh (دار السلام تبلف) is a sub-committee of the Khoja Shi'a Ithnasheri Jamaat of Dar es Salaam, Tanzania.

Its activities include

- Release of weekly Friday Supplement
- Running of Husayni Madrasah
- Publishing Islamic books

It is supported by the Al-Itrah Foundation.
