= Sidi Saiyyed Mosque =

Mosque in Ahmedabad, Gujarat, India

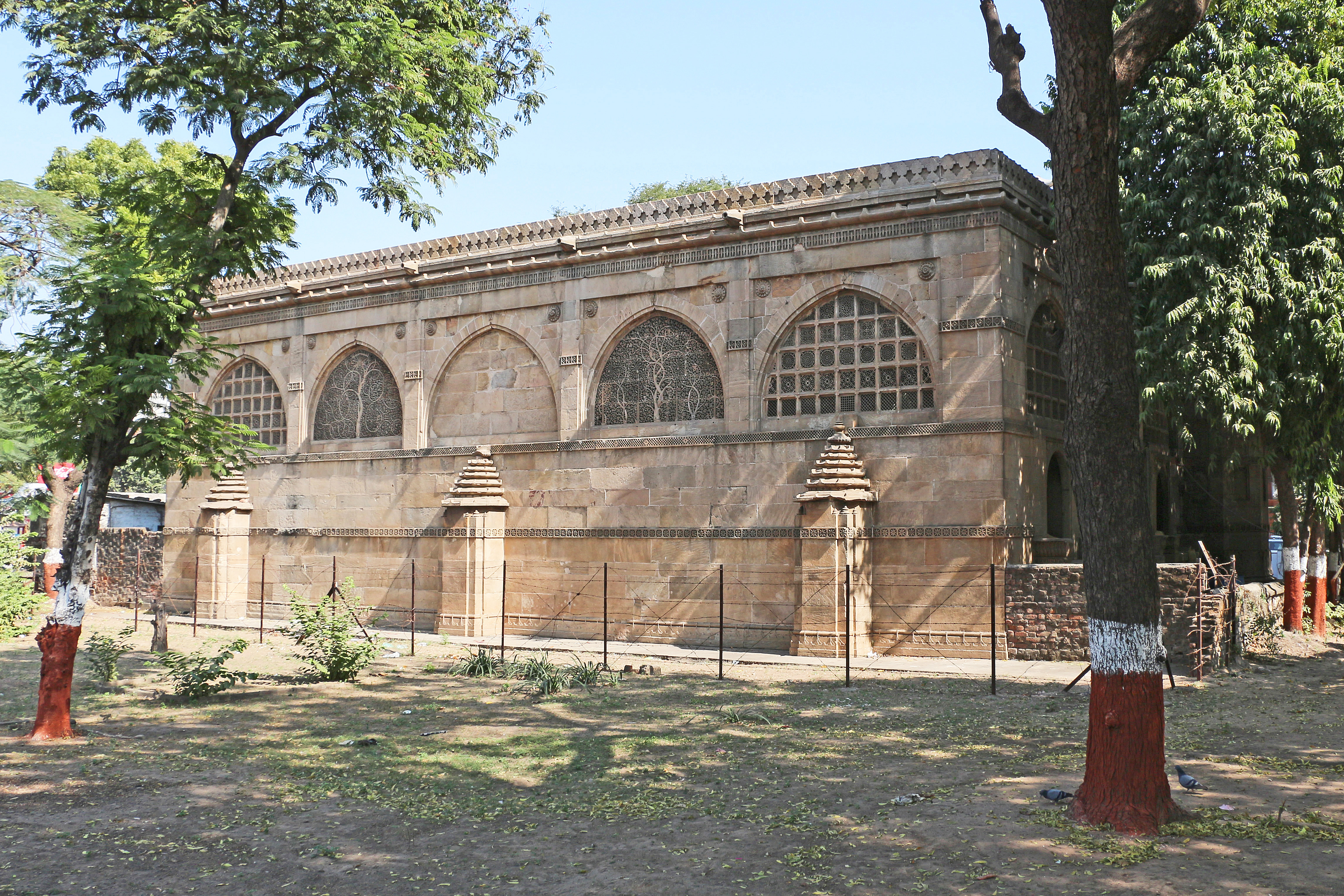
- The mosque in 2013

- Location in Ahmedabad

Religion
- Affiliation: Sunni Islam
- Ecclesiastical or organizational status: Mosque
- Status: Active

Location
- Location: Ahmedabad, Gujarat
- Country: India
- Interactive map of Sidi Saiyyed Mosque
- Coordinates: 23°01′37″N 72°34′52″E

Architecture
- Type: Mosque architecture
- Founder: Sidi Saiyyid
- Completed: 980 AH (1572/1573 CE)
- Dome: One

Monument of National Importance
- Official name: Sidi Saiyyed Mosque
- Reference no.: N-GJ-3

The Sidi Saiyyed Mosque, popularly known locally as Sidi Saiyyed ni Jali, is a Sunni mosque located in Ahmedabad, in the state of Gujarat, India. The mosque was built by Sidi Sayyad, a Habshi nobleman, in 980 AH (1572/1573 CE). The structure is designated as a Monument of National Importance.

== History ==
The Sidi Saiyyed Mosque, known locally as Sidi Saiyyed ki/ni Jali, was built in 980 AH (1572/1573 CE), is a mosque in Ahmedabad.

As attested by the marble tablet fixed on the wall of the mosque, it was built by Shaikh Sa'id Al-Habshi Sultani. Sidi Sa'id was originally a slave of Rumi Khan, a Turkish general who had come to Gujarat from Yemen, bringing along with him his Habshi slaves. Sidi Sa'id later served Sultan Mahmud III, and upon his death, joined the Abyssinian general Jhujhar Khan. Upon Sidi Sa'id's retirement from military service, Jhujhar Khan granted him a jagir. Sidi Sa'id over his career became a prominent nobleman: he collected a library, owned over a hundred slaves, performed the Hajj pilgrimage, and instituted a langar (public kitchen). Previously at the site there was a smaller brick mosque, which was rebuilt by Sidi Sa'id, and he was buried near the mosque when he died in 1576. The mosque was built in the last year of the existence of Gujarat Sultanate.

During the British colonial period, it served as an office or kachery for the Mamlatdar of Dascrohi taluka. During its time as an office, doors were installed, the mihrabs were converted into presses, and the interior was whitewashed. During an official visit to Ahmadabad, Lord Curzon, Viceroy of India, ordered the Mamlatdar's office to vacate the premises, as part of his wider policies of preserving historic monuments.

== Architecture ==
The mosque is entirely arcuated and is known for its ten intricately carved stone latticework windows (jalis) on the side and rear arches. The rear wall is filled with square stone pierced panels in geometrical designs. The two bays flanking the central aisle have reticulated stone slabs carved in designs of intertwined trees and foliage and a palm motif. This intricately carved lattice stone window is the Sidi Saiyyed Jali, the unofficial symbol of city of Ahmedabad and the inspiration for the design of the logo of the Indian Institute of Management Ahmedabad.

The central window arch of the mosque, where another intricate jali would typically be expected, is instead walled with stone. This is possibly because the mosque was not completed according to plan before the Mughals invaded Gujarat.

== Gallery ==
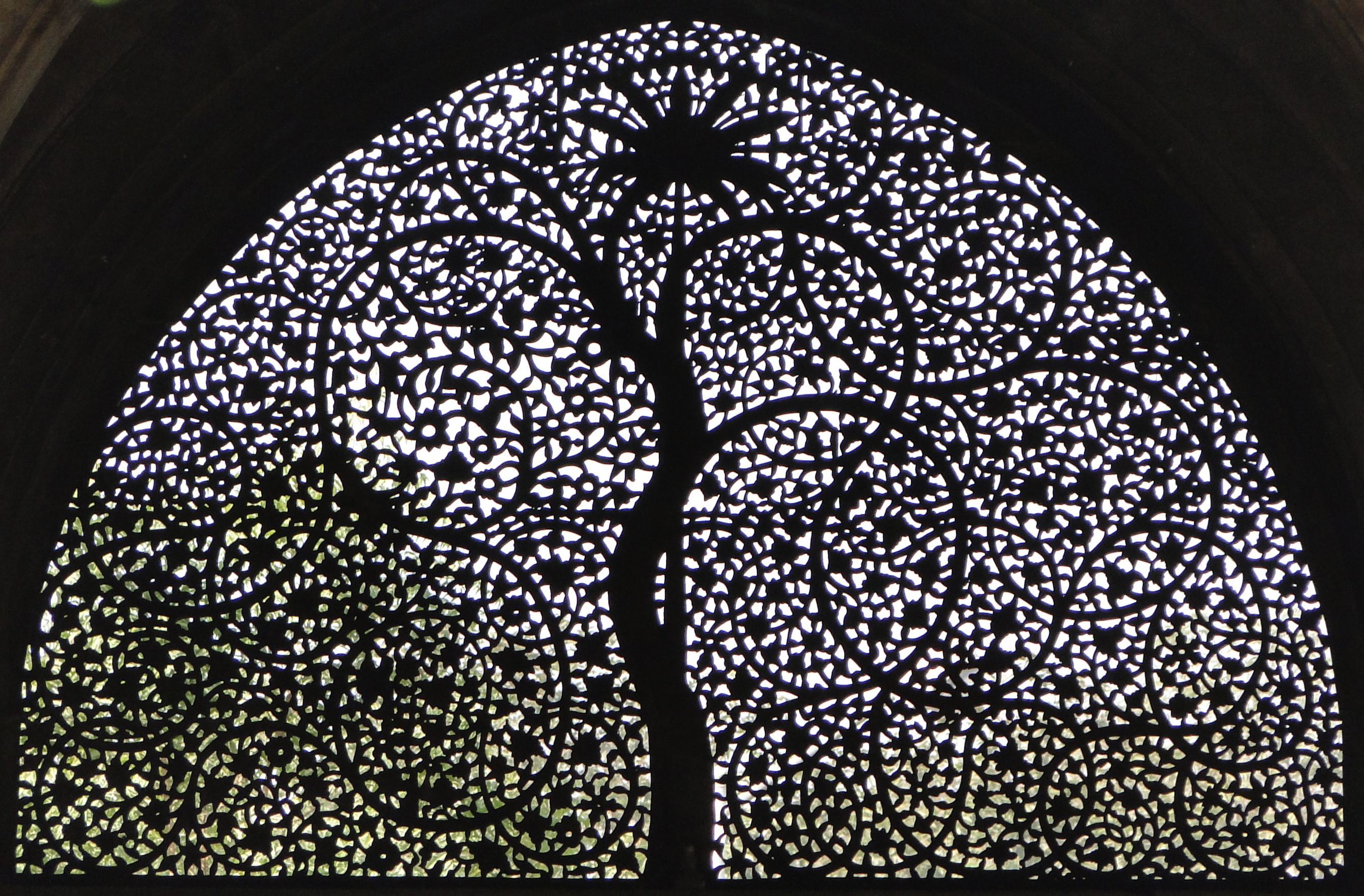
The marble screen from inside

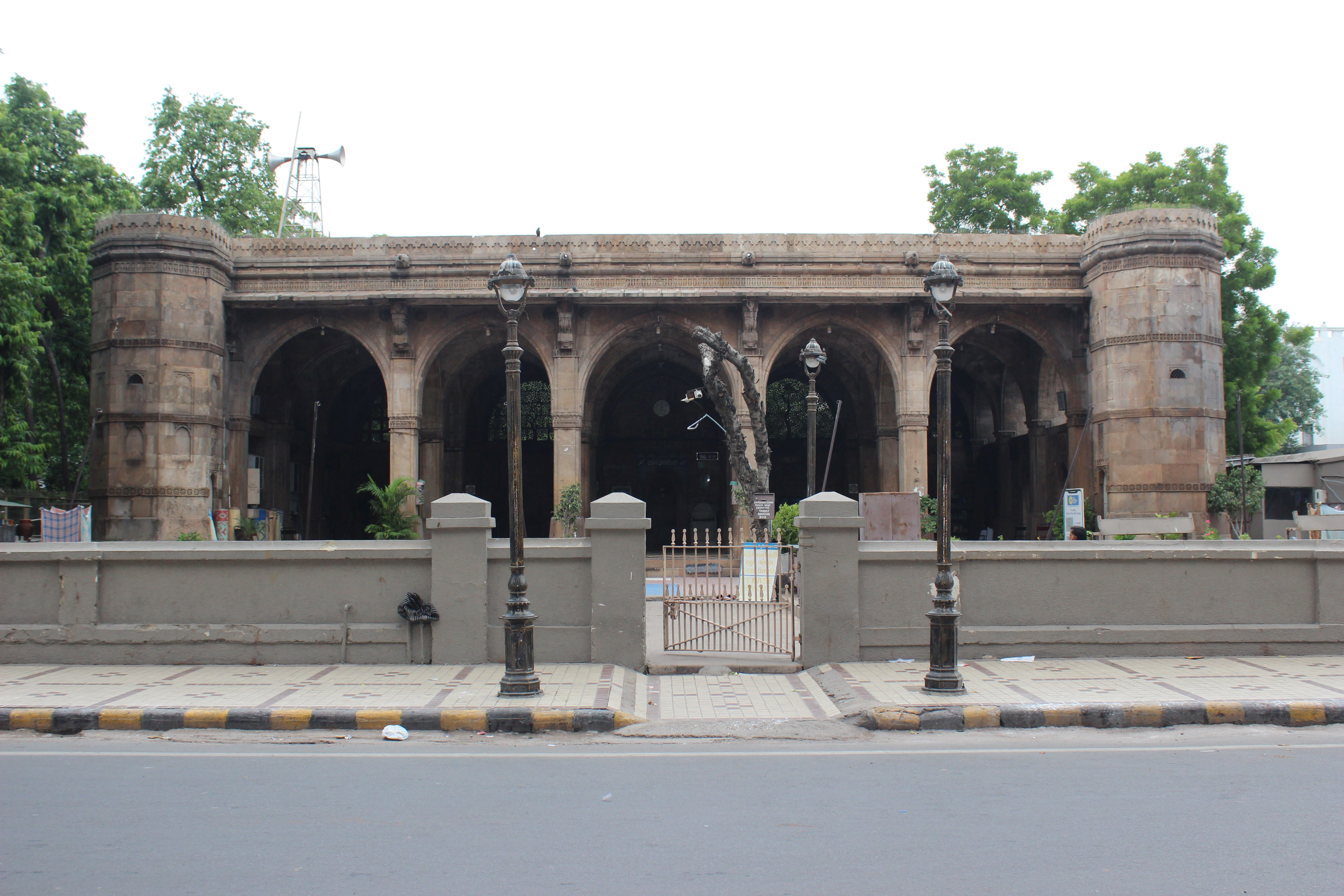
Front view of the mosque

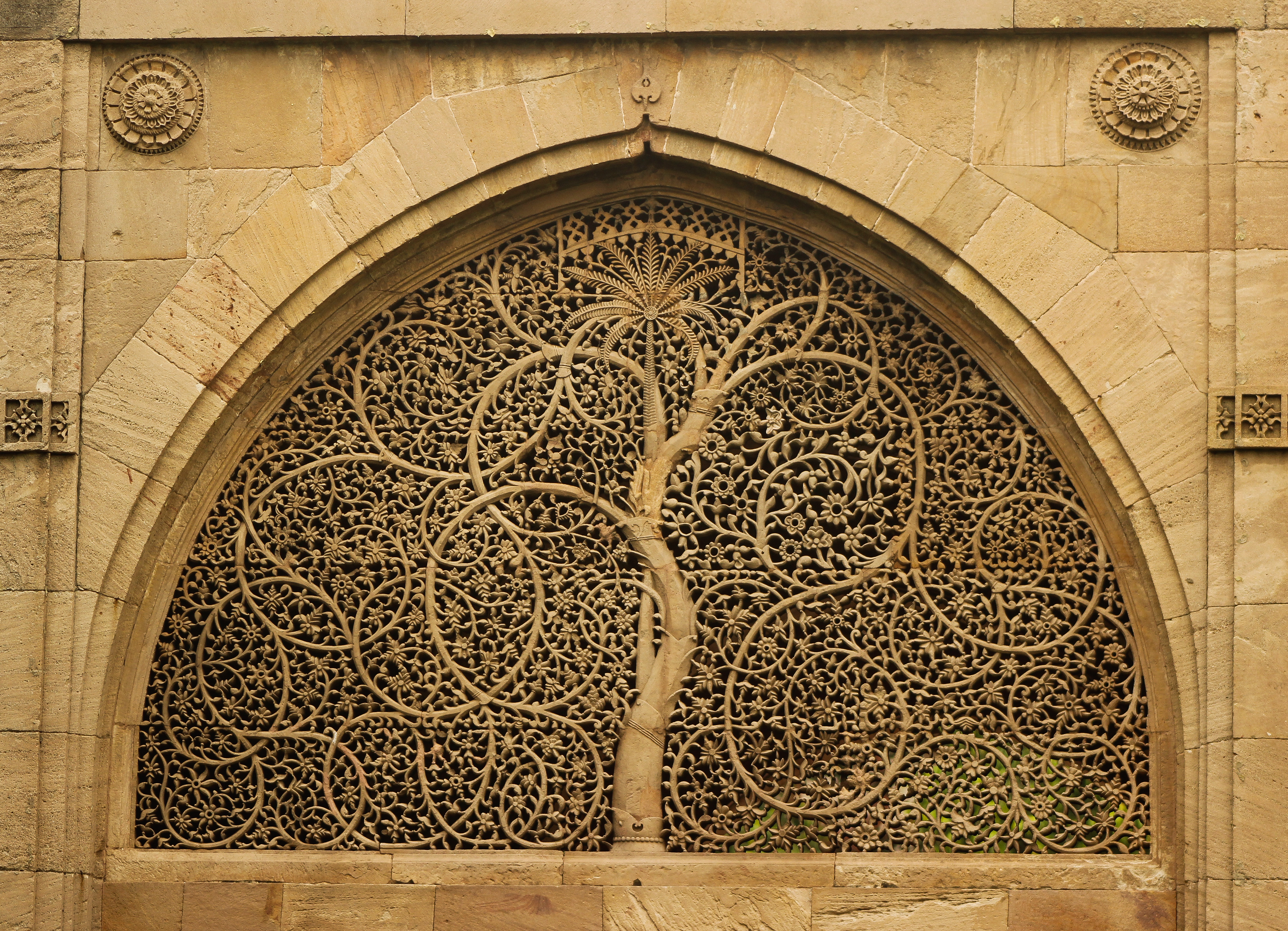
The marble screen from outside

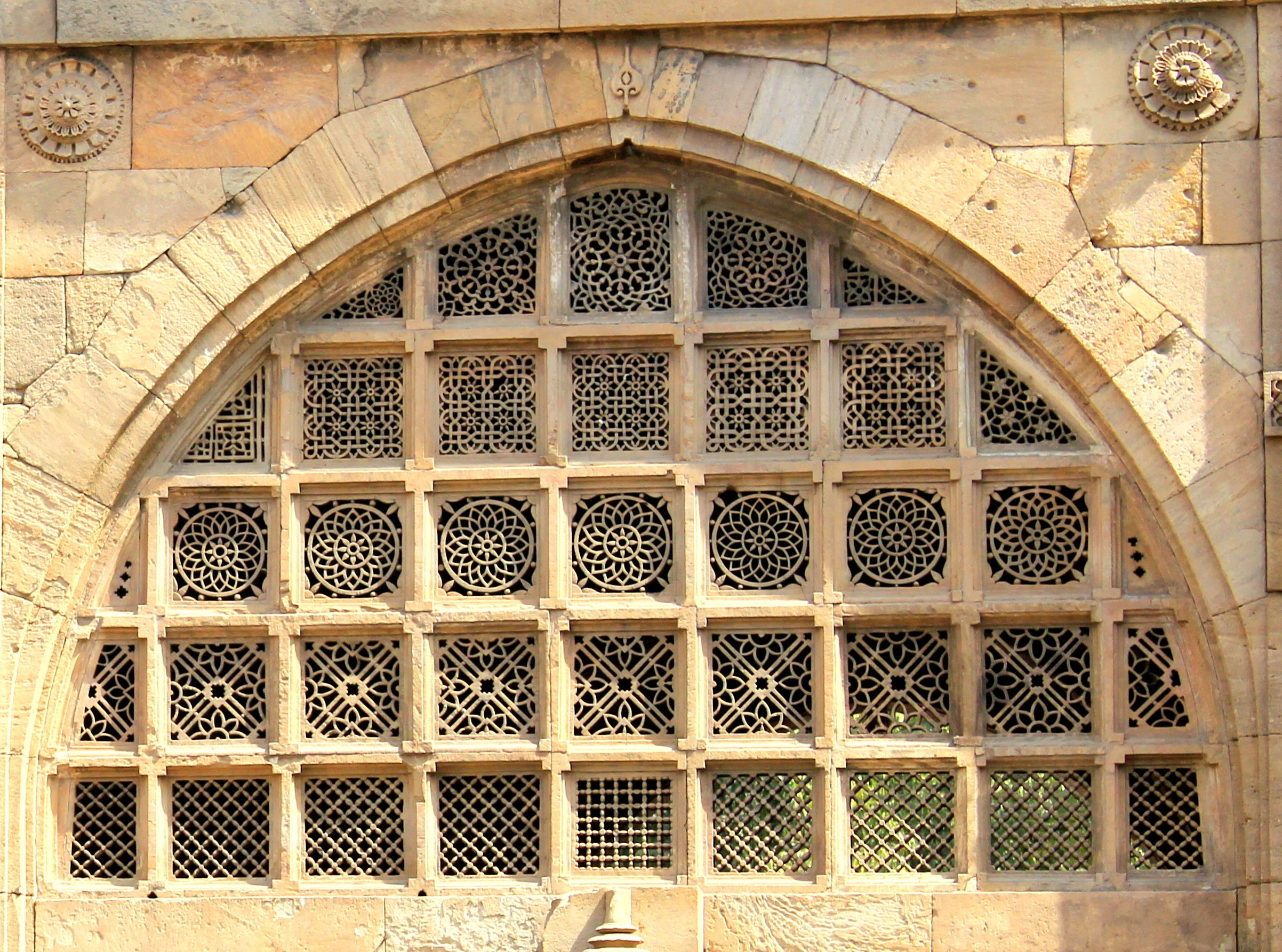
Mosque

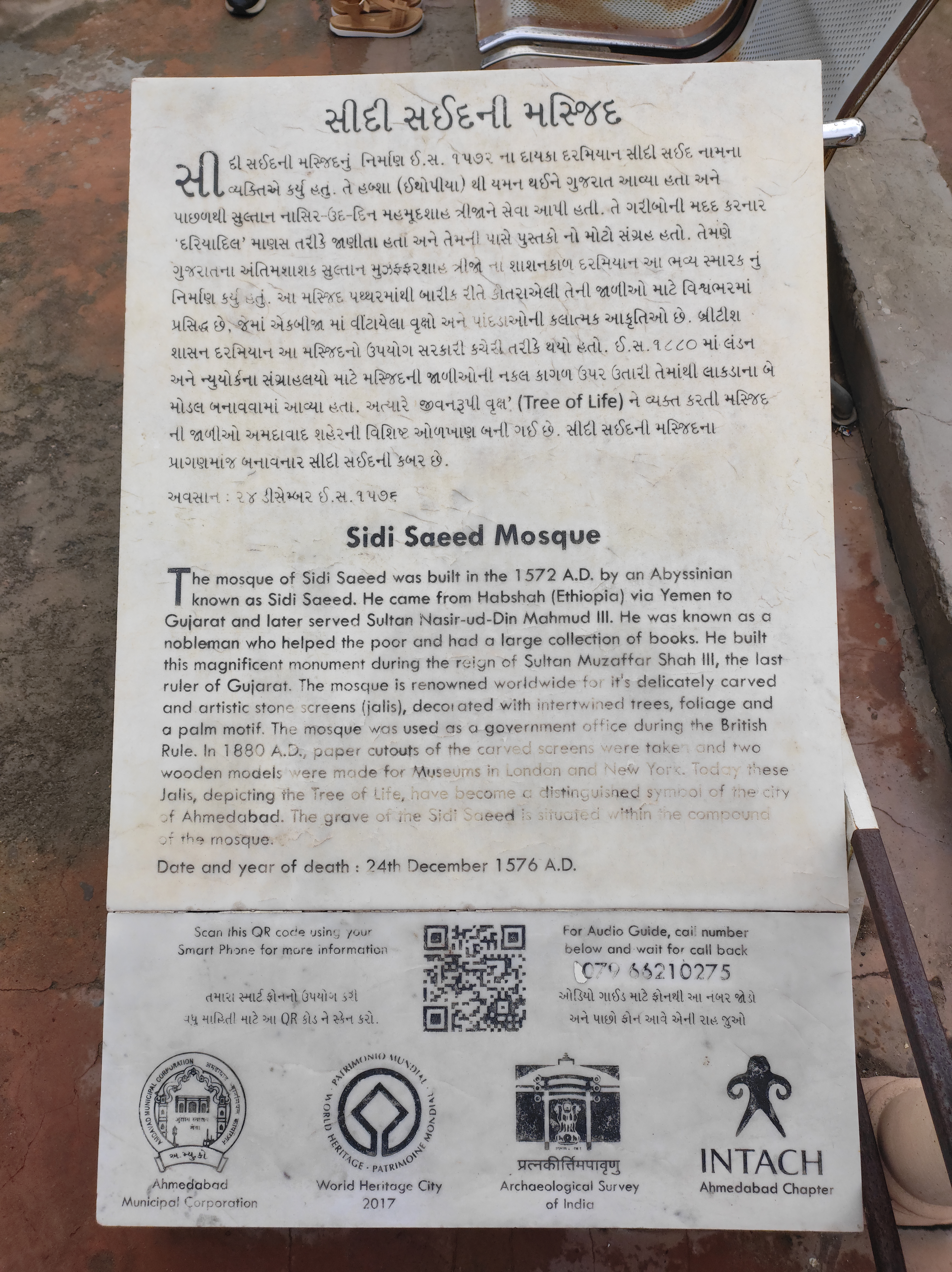
Plaque

== See also ==
- Islam in India
- List of mosques in India
- List of Monuments of National Importance in Gujarat
- Imamshah Bawa Dargah
