= Khoja (community) =

Nizari Isma'ili Shia Islamic community in India

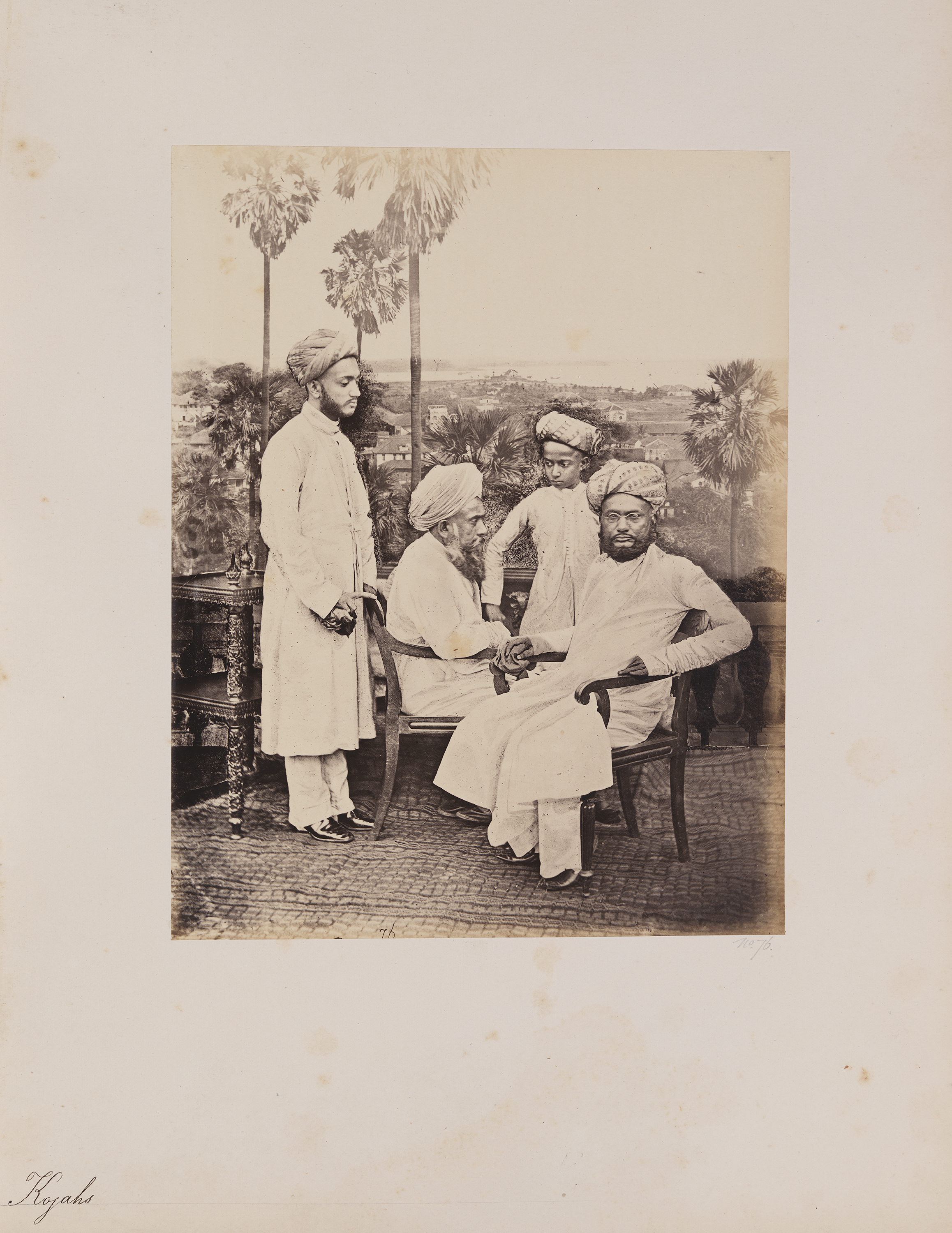
- Khojas of Western India ca. 1855-1862

Regions with significant populations
- Gujarat, Sindh, Maharashtra

Languages
- Gujarati, Kutchi, Sindhi, Hindi/Urdu

Religion
- Nizari-Ismaili Shia (majority), Twelver Shia, Sunni (minority)

The Khoja are a tribe or caste of Muslims—mainly members of the Nizari Ismaʿiliyyah sect of Shia Islam, with a minority being either Twelver Shiites or, to a lesser extent, Sunnis. They originate from the western Indian subcontinent, having converted to Islam from Hinduism by the 14th century by the Persian pīr (religious leader or teacher) Saḍr-al-Dīn.

In India, most Khojas live in the states of Gujarat, Maharashtra, Rajasthan and the city of Hyderabad. In Pakistan, most Khoja live in Karachi, Hyderabad and Thatta in Sindh province, and in Gwadar in Balochistan province.

In Oman a large portion of them live in Muscat where they are known as the Lawatia. Across Africa and especially in East Africa, the Khoja have historically dominated business in various fields however many of these families migrated to Europe in the colonial era or immediately afterwards. In Madagascar, the Khoja are known by the honorific Karana title and are now concentrated in the capital.

The Khoja originally observed Hinduism and then became adherents of Nizari Isma'ilism in the medieval period. In the late 19th and early 20th centuries, particularly in the aftermath of the Aga Khan Case, fractures emerged among the community as many Khojas split off to join the much larger Sunni and Twelver Shiite communities of South Asia, while the majority remained Nizari Isma'ili.

== Etymology ==
The term Khoja derives from Khwāja (New Persian Khājé), a Persian honorific title (خواجه) of pious individuals used in Turco-Persian influenced regions of the Muslim world.

The specific term Khoja in the Gujarati and Sindhi languages, was first bestowed by the Persianate Nizari Isma'ili Sadardin (died c. 15th century) upon his followers during the lifetime of the Nizari Ismaili Imam Islam Shah (1368-1423 CE). As such, Pir Shihab al-din Shah, brother of one of the Nizari Ismaili imams, wrote regarding the origins of the Khojas that the very formation of the community came about through Pir Sadardin's devotion to the Imam.

Many Lohanas of Gujarat converted to Nizari Ismailism due to the efforts of Pir Sadardin. They gradually used the title Khoja. Before the arrival of the Aga Khan from Persia to British rule in India in the 19th century, Khojas retained many Hindu traditions, including a variation on the belief in the Dashavatara.

== History ==
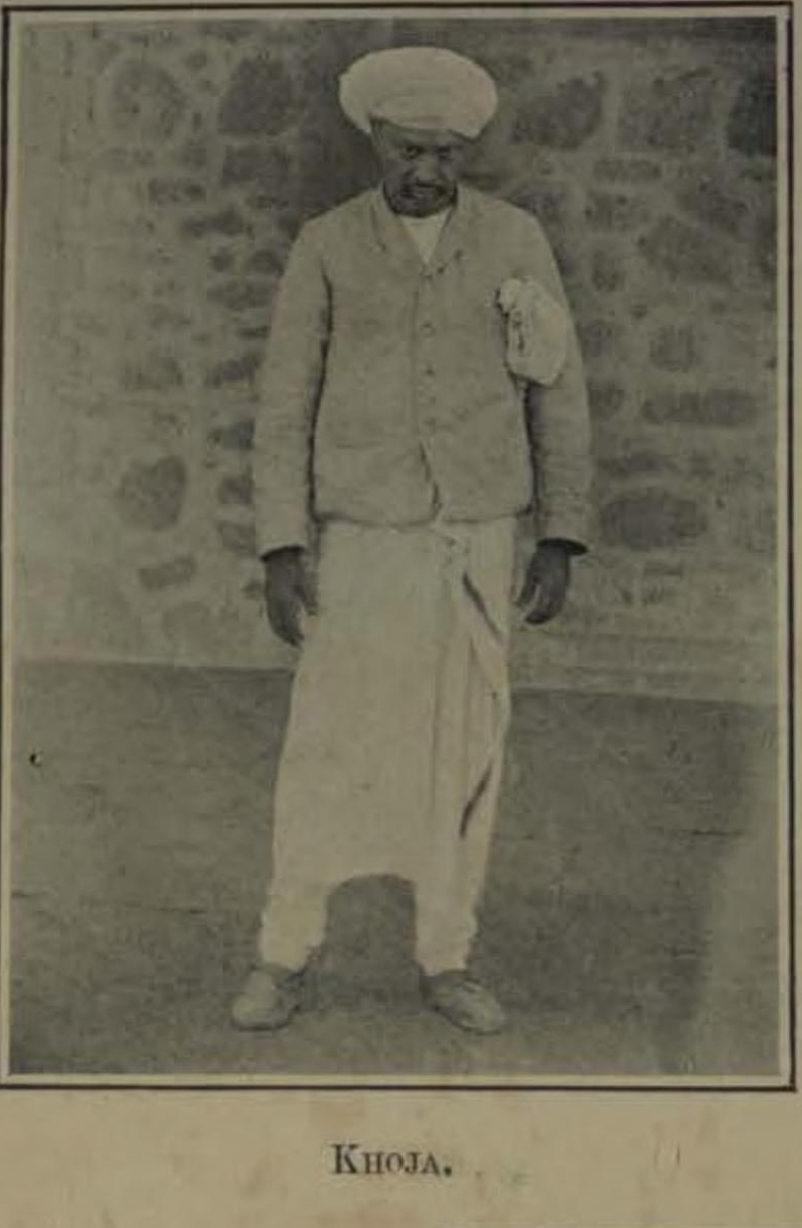
A photograph of a Khoja man, 1911

=== Origins and syncretism ===
The Khojas are an ethnic and cultural group originating from Hindu Lohanas. Their ethnonym Khoja is derived from the Persian term khwāja, which roughly translates to 'Lord' or 'Master', a translation of the traditional Lohana title of ṭhakkar. However, this term also included certain groups such as Charanas, predominantly from Gujarat and Kutch.

The Hindu Lohanas from Sindh were converted to Nizārī Ismāʿīlism by Pīr Ṣadr al-Dīn in the fourteenth and fifteenth centuries. Ṣadr al-Dīn was a dāʿī ("missionary") acting on behalf of the Nizārī imām who lived in Persia. Ṣadr al-Dīn belonged to a hereditary lineage of pīrs who served as leaders for the Khoja community as a deputy of the imām in Persia.

The pīrs composed religious hymns called gināns that served as the religious scriptures for the Khojas rather than the Qurʾān. The majority of the gināns glorify the Nizārī imām as an absolute and infallible leader. Some gināns contain large amounts of Hindu-Muslim syncretism, with Hindu deities being identified with Muslim figures. The gināns took inspiration from diverse traditions, including Nizārī Ismāʿīlism, Hindu Sant and Bhakti traditions, and Ṣūfism. Such syncretism with Hinduism has been viewed as a strategy by the Ismāʿīlī missionaries to convert Hindus, as well as taqiyya to hide them from other Muslims. The religion of the Khojas was known as Satpanth.

At the end of the fifteenth century, the imām in Persia, al-Mustanṣir bi-llāh II, abolished the pīrs as a source of religious authority, and replaced them with a book called Pandiyāt-i jawānmardī, which was then translated into Gujarātī. Imām Shāh (d. 1513) was supposed to become the next pīr, but in response to the imam's decision, Imam Shāh's son Nūr Muḥammad claimed he was the imām and founded a splinter sect called the Imām-Shāhīs, also known as the Sat-Panthīs.

In the nineteenth century, the Khojas gathered in jamāʿatkhāna buildings, did not read the Qurʾān, and generally did not follow Islamic law.

The Khojas, mainly merchants from Kutch and Kathiawar, began moving to Bombay in the late 1700s. There they were engaged in petty trade and shop-keeping, with larger magnates gaining fortunes from trade routes with China, Muscat, and Zanzibar.

=== Arrival of Āghā Khān and Ismāʿīlī Islamisation ===
In 1845, Ḥasan ʿAlī Shāh aka Āghā Khān I moved to India due to conflict with the Qajar dynasty in Persia. He settled in Bombay, which had the largest concentration of Khojas in India. For centuries the Khojas had been a self governing community with nominal allegiance to a distant Nizārī imām in Persia, but the newly arrived Āghā Khān sought to interfere in their internal affairs. This led to conflict in the Khoja community, culminating in the Āghā Khān case of 1866. The Khoja plaintiffs argued that community in fact were Sunnī Muslims and thus were not under the authority of the Āghā Khān imām. The British judge decided in favour of the defendant, Āghā Khān I, ruling that the Khojas were the descendants of Hindus who became Shīʿa Ismāʿīlīs and thus were under the religious authority of the imām, Āghā Khān I. In response to the verdict, some Khojas converted to Sunnī Islam.

The imām succeeding the next imām, Sulṭān Muḥammad Shāh Āghā Khān III (r. 1885–1957) continued to attempt exert his authority over the Khojas and push them towards normative Ismāʿīlī–Shīʿa Islam; this led to the Haji Bibi case. The plaintiffs in the Haji Bibi case of 1908 claimed that the Khojas were followers of Twelver Shīʿa Islam, however the British judge upheld that the Khojas were Ismāʿīlī and so those Khojas split off to follow Twelver Shi'ism.

In the nineteenth and twentieth centuries, the Khojas were under pressure from the Āghā Khāns as well as Muslim and Hindu fundamentalist movements to alter their religion. The religious fundamentalists considered the Khojas to be heretics who should convert to Sunnī or Twelver Shīʿī Islam or normative Hinduism. The Āghā Khāns who wielded religious power over the community as imām sought to Islamise the community to normative Ismāʿīlism. The gināns were codified under their authority, those with Hindu influences were purged, and new gināns were composed with Qurʾānic verses. The use of the Gujarātī language was also replaced by English. By the time of the imām Shāh Karīm al-Ḥusaynī Āghā Khān IV (r. 1957-2025), the Khojas had been integrated into a transnational Ismāʿīlī community with a focus on the Qurʾān and literacy of Islamic concepts.

The Khojas live today in India and Pakistan, with a significant diaspora in East Africa, Europe, and North America. They show a strong commitment to the values of Indo-Muslim philanthropy in their business entrepreneurship and contribution to societies in which they live. From the 18th century, some of the Khojas have migrated to the Persian Gulf region, mainly in the Sultanate of Oman and U.A.E, where they are known as Al-Lawatia.

== Khoja communities ==
=== Isma'ili Khojas ===
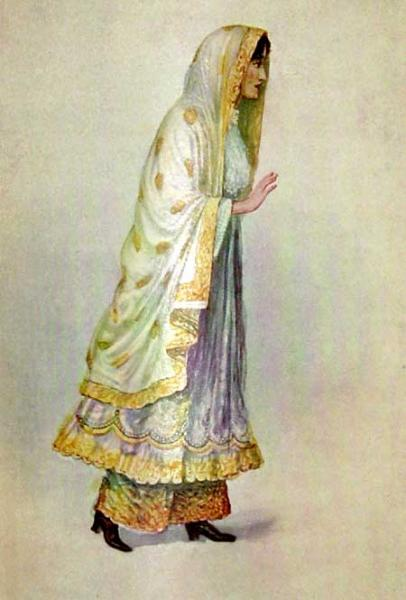
A watercolor painting of a Khoja woman by M. V. Dhurandhar, 1928

Originally Nizari Isma'ili, after the 1866 Aga Khan Case that consolidated the bulk of the Bombay Khoja community under the leadership of the Aga Khan. The Khojas credit their title to Pir Sadr al-Din who allegedly laid the foundations for the Nizari Ismaili community in India, even before the Anjudan phase of the history of Nizari Ismailism.

=== Twelver Khojas ===
Khojas who follow Twelver Shia Islam and have large communities in Pakistan, India, East Africa, North America and the United Kingdom. Moulvi Ali Baksh who had settled in Mumbai in the mid-late 1800s was a prominent Moulvi with great respect in Ithna'ashari Khoja community. It is said that then the Shias were organised into a distinct community by Moulvi Ali Baksh himself. (Excerpts as translated from the book Greatness Bygone authored by Ziauddin Ahmed Barni Published by Taleemi Markaz Karachi on 30 July 1961, Page: 342 written on one of 93 great personalities Ali Mohammed Moulvi. The author had not met only 2 of the 93 personalities noted in his book).

Twelver Khojas are said to have broken away from the Isma'ili Khojas due to their determination to defend their remembrance practices against Aga Khan's efforts to ban them, in order to elevate his personal status as the reincarnation of Isma'il ibn Ja'far, the seventh Imām of the Isma'ilis.

== Culture ==
=== Dress ===
Traditionally, Khoja men wore a pāghaḍī (loose white turban), chol (double breasted jacket), suthaḷī (trousers) or dhotiyuṁ (dhoti), and pointed shoes. By the second half of the 20th century, Khoja men had forsaken their traditional garb in favour of ṭopī (velvet cap), kabjo (European shirt/long jacket), paheraṇ (collarless inner shirt), and survāl (European buttoned trousers or waist-string trousers). Khoja women wear a tight blouse or short armed jacket, a ghāghro skirt as a lower garment, and an oḍhaṇī (veil) on the head.

== See also ==
- Khojki, a script used exclusively by the Khoja community to write their language
- Momna, Nizari Ismailis from northern Gujarat

== Bibliography ==
- Azim Malikov, Kinship systems of Xoja groups in Southern Kazakhstan in Anthropology of the Middle East, Volume 12, Issue 2, Winter 2017, pр.78-91
- Azim Malikov, Sacred Lineages in Central Asia: Translocality and Identity in Mobilities, Boundaries, and Travelling Ideas: Rethinking Translocality Beyond Central Asia and the Caucasus edited by Manja Stephan-¬Emmrich and Philipp Schröder (Cambridge: Open Book Publishers), 2018, pp. 121–150
- Azim Malikov, Khoja in Kazakhstan: identity transformations in Max Planck Institute for Social Anthropology Department ‘Integration and Conflict’ Field Notes and research Projects VI CASCA – Centre for Anthropological Studies on Central Asia: Framing the Research, Initial Projects. Eds.: Günther Schlee. Halle/Saale, 2013, pp. 101–107
