= Momna =

Momna (Momin)
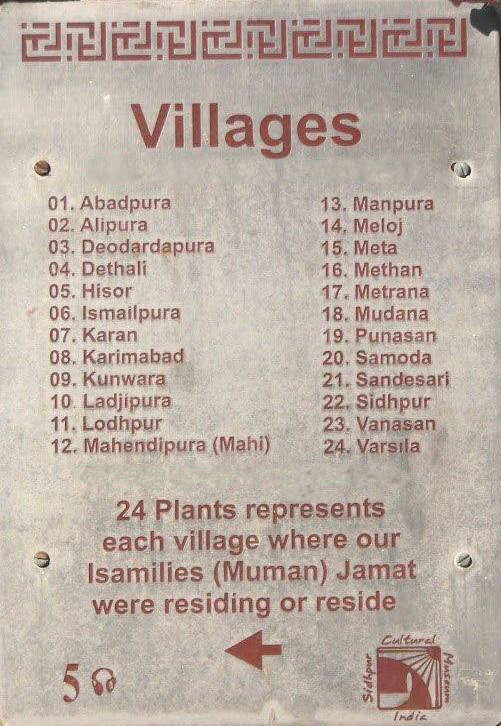
- Historical Momna gathering

Regions with significant populations
- Gujarat (India), Pakistan (formerly British India), East Africa, United States, Iran, Canada, United Kingdom, New Zealand, and other diaspora communities

Languages
- Gujarati, English, Hindi, and Urdu (developed in northern India, including Delhi) and Farsi

Religion
- Islam: Shia Imami Ismaili (Nizari) Muslim, Sunni Muslim and Salafi (Wahhabi) Muslim

Related ethnic groups
- Ismailis, Khoja, Satpanth communities, Patidar convert groups and Iranian

The Momna (Momin), also spelled Mumna, Momina, or Muman, are a Muslim community originating in the state of Gujarat in India. Historically tied to the Satpanthi Ismaili tradition, the Momna who converted to Islam through Ismaili Shia missionaries. Over centuries, the Momna experienced persecution, shifts in religious alignment, and widespread migration, which led to the emergence of distinct religious subgroups as well as a sizable global diaspora.

== History and origin ==
The Momna community’s origins are rooted in the Satpanth Ismaili movement of the Indian subcontinent. The community emerged through the missionary efforts of early Ismaili Pirs, most notably Pir Satgur Noor and Pir Tajdin, who spread the faith among agrarian and artisan groups in northern Gujarat. These conversions were centered primarily in the regions of Sidhpur, Patan, and Mehsana, where the community established its foundational socio-religious identity.

During the reign of the Mughal Emperor Aurangzeb, Ismaili Momnas faced prolonged persecution. Many practiced taqiyyah (religious dissimulation), externally adopting Sunni customs to avoid harassment. Over time, parts of the community drifted away from their original Ismaili identity. Those who remained are referred to as “the Momnas of the old faith” (junā dharma nā moman) or , while those who assimilated into Sunni Islam became known as “Chiliyas” or “the Momnas of the new faith” (navā dharma nā moman).

=== Clan-based surnames ===
Within the Ismaili Momna subgroup, community identity developed around clan-based surnames derived from ancestral villages, occupations, or shared lineage. Common Momna surnames include: Maknojia, Charolia, Maredia, Prasla, Karedia, Kadiwal, Umatiya, Dholasaniya, Mahesania, Manesia, Dhuka, Karowadia, and Badarpura. These names remain widespread in India and across the global Ismaili Momna diaspora.

== Present circumstances ==
Historically, the Momna community relied on agriculture and weaving, and many early migrants to urban centers in India worked as taxi drivers and in small restaurants. Over time, economic mobility, led to a wide diversification of occupations.

In diaspora communities, especially in the United States and Canada, Momnas have moved into a wide range of professions and businesses. A large and visible part of the community is based in Houston, Texas, which has become one of the main centers of Momna settlement in North America. In Houston and nearby areas, many community members own and operate gas stations, while others work in professional fields such as finance, engineering, information technology, healthcare, and medicine.

Across North America, Momnas are also involved in small business ownership, including:

- Convenience stores
- Wholesale distribution outlets
- Manufacturing facilities
- Restaurants and food-service chains
- Franchised retail businesses
- Hotels and motels
- Car dealerships
- Television media ventures
- Steel fabrication plants
- Venture capital funds
- Private equity funds
- Software development firms

These shifts reflect significant socio-economic growth and entrepreneurial expansion within the community.

Momna professionals are also active in corporate sectors, finance, engineering, information technology, healthcare, and the medical field, demonstrating increasing educational attainment and integration into mainstream economies.

== See also ==
- Ismailism
- Satpanth
- Khoja
- Patidar
- Nizari Ismaili
