= Noorani family =

Ismaili dynasty

The Noorani family is a term used to refer to the immediate family of the Imām of the Nizari Ismāʿīli Shia Muslims, commonly known by the title of Aga Khan.

The title of 'His Highness' was initially granted by the British Monarch to the Ismaili Imams dating back in mid 1800s, to the first Aga Khan, in recognition as a religious leader and his role as spiritual head of the Ismaili community. The style of His Highness was formally granted to the Aga Khan IV by Queen Elizabeth II in 1957 upon the death of his grandfather the Aga Khan III. (Note: This style has been continually recognized, on a personal basis, by the British monarch, to whom the Aga Khans were previously temporal subjects — the incumbent is a British citizen — since 1866. In 1959, Mohammad Reza Pahlavi, Shah of Iran — whose Qajar predecessors first awarded Imam Hasan Ali Shah the title of Aga Khan in 1818 — bestowed upon the Aga Khan IV the higher style of Royal Highness in 1959, but that style fell into disuse following the Iranian Revolution of 1979.) It has continued to this day, being reconfirmed after each succession.

The titles Prince and Princess are used by the Aga Khans and their children by virtue of their descent from Fath-Ali Shah Qajar of the Iranian Qajar dynasty. The title was officially recognised by the British government in 1938.

The Qajar monarch Fath Ali Shah granted the title "Agha Khan" (also spelled "Aqa Khan," meaning "lord and master") to Hasan Ali Shah, later known as Aga Khan I, when he was thirteen. Hasan Ali Shah, then the Nizari Isma'ili Imam, traveled to the Qajar court in Tehran with his mother to seek legal redress following his father's death. The title became hereditary among his successors. Fath Ali Shah also arranged a marriage between Hasan Ali Shah and his daughter, Sarv-e Jahan Khanum, providing land in the Mahallat region as part of the dowry. The current titleholder, Rahim Al-Hussaini, is the fifth Nizari Imam to hold the title Aga Khan.

== Members ==
- Rahim Al-Hussaini, Aga Khan V (born 1971)
    - Irfan Aga Khan (b. 2015)
    - Sinan Aga Khan (b. 2017)
  - Zahra Aga Khan (b. 1970)
    - Sara Boyden (b. 2000)
    - Iliyan Boyden (b. 2002)
  - Hussain Aga Khan (b. 1974)
  - Fareen Aga Khan (b. 1975), wife of Hussain Aga Khan (m. 2019)
  - Aly Muhammad Aga Khan (b. 2000)
- Other children of Aly Khan (1911–1960), father of the Aga Khan IV
  - Amyn Muhammad Aga Khan (b. 1937)
  - Yasmin Aga Khan (b. 1949)
- Catherine Aleya Aga Khan (née Catherine Aleya Beriketti, b. 1938, former wife of Cyril Sursock), widow of Sadruddin Aga Khan (m. 1972), third son of the Aga Khan III

=== Recently deceased members ===
- Karim Al-Hussaini, Aga Khan IV (1936 - 2025)
- Begum Om Habibeh Aga Khan, Mata Salamat (née Yvonne Blanche Labrousse, 1906–2000), m. (1944) The Aga Khan III
- Descendants of Aga Khan III (1877–1957)
  - Giuseppe Mahdi Khan (died 1911)
  - Aly Khan, father of the Aga Khan IV (1911–1960), m. (1936 div. 1949) Taj-ud-dawlah Aga Khan (née The Hon. Joan Barbara Yarde-Buller, later wife of the 2nd Viscount Camrose), m. (1949 div. 1953) Rita Hayworth (née Margarita Carmen Cansino, former wife of Orson Welles)
  - Sadruddin Aga Khan (1933–2003), m. (1957 div. 1962) Shirin Aga Khan (née Nina Sheila Dyer, 1930–1965, former wife of Baron Hans Heinrich Thyssen-Bornemisza),
  - Andrew Ali Embiricos (1985–2011), son of Yasmin Aga Khan

=== Living former members ===
- Salimah Aga Khan, b. 1941, former wife of the Aga Khan IV (m. 1969; div. 1995)
- Inaara Aga Khan, b. 1963, former wife of the Aga Khan IV (m. 1998; div. 2011)
- Khaliya Aga Khan, b. 1977, former wife of Hussain Aga Khan (m. 2006; div. 2013)
- Salwa Aga Khan, b. 1988, former wife of Aga Khan V (m. 2013; div. 2022)
