= Aga Khan =

Islamic hereditary title

Prince Aga Khan of the Imamate of the Nizari Ismāʿīli Shias
- Persian: آقاخان; Arabic: آغا خان

Incumbent
- Rahim al-Hussaini since 4 February 2025

Details
- First monarch: Hasan Ali Shah
- Formed: 1817

Aga Khan (Persian: آقاخان; Arabic: آغا خان; also transliterated as Aqa Khan and Agha Khan) is the hereditary title of the spiritual leader and Imām of the Nizari Ismāʿīli Shias, a branch of Islam with approximately 12–15 million followers worldwide. The Aga Khan serves as both the religious head and temporal leader of the Ismaili community, providing spiritual guidance and overseeing extensive development and humanitarian work across Asia, Africa, and other regions where Ismailis live.

The title, which means "Great Leader" or "Grand Commander," has been passed down through a hereditary line for over 150 years, with each Aga Khan believed by his followers to be a descendant of Muhammad. Unlike many other Islamic leadership positions, the Aga Khan's authority combines religious interpretation with significant involvement in education, healthcare, cultural preservation, and economic development.

The current holder of the title is the 50th hereditary Imām, Prince Shah Rahim al-Hussaini, Aga Khan V, who acceded to the Imamat on 4 February 2025 upon the death of his father, Prince Shah Karim al-Hussaini, Aga Khan IV, who had led the community for nearly 68 years. The succession was formalized through his father's will, and he was granted the style "His Highness" by King Charles III, continuing a tradition dating back to the first Aga Khan.

== Title ==
The title is made up of the titles "agha" and "khan". The Turkish "agha" is "aqa" (Āqā) in Persian. The word "agha" comes from the Old Turkic and Mongolian "aqa", meaning "elder men", and means something like "master" or "lord". "Khan" means king or ruler in Turkish and Mongolian languages. Combining the terms together the title means commanding chief, lord, or master.

According to Farhad Daftary, a scholar at the Institute of Isma'ili Studies, Aga Khan is an honorific title bestowed on Hasan Ali Shah (1804–1881), the 46th Imām of Nizari Ismai'lis (1817–1881), by the Iranian monarch Fath-Ali Shah Qajar. The Aga Khan III noted in a famous legal proceeding in India that Aga Khan is not a title but instead an alias that was given to the Aga Khan I when he was a young man.

The Noorani family is a term used to refer to the immediate family of the Aga Khan.

== History ==
During the latter stages of the First Anglo-Afghan War (1841–1842), Hasan Ali Shah and his cavalry officers provided assistance to General Nott in Kandahar Province and to General England in his advance from Sindh to join Nott. For these and for other diligent efforts made by him in the service of the Empire, the British Raj recognised him as a "Prince"; it was not an uncommon practice for the British to consolidate their hold on India by handing out similar titles liberally to any large landowner or tribal chieftain with local influence who made himself useful to them.

The Aga Khan was exceptional in that, while it was the local tribal influence that had enabled him to serve the British and gain their favour, his claim to nobility was based upon his claim to leadership of an entire sect of Islam. Imperial Britain saw great possibilities in having under their control and patronage the head of a major Shia sect; it could even be used at some later stage to counterbalance the influence of the Ottoman Caliph, the head of Islam as recognized by the Sunni sects. The Aga Khan was the only religious or community leader in British India granted a personal gun salute.

In 1866, the Aga Khan won a court victory in the High Court of Bombay in what popularly became known as the Aga Khan Case, securing Aga Khan I's recognition by the British government as the Imām of the Isma'ilis/Khoja community. The Aga Khan is also the Pir within the Nizari Ismaili community.

In 1887, the Secretary of State for India, acting through the Viceroy of India, formally recognized the title Aga Khan.

== List of Aga Khans ==
Five Ismāʿīli imāms have held this title:

- Aga Khan I – Hasan Ali Shah Mahallati (1804–1881), 46th hereditary Imam of Nizari Ismailis (1817–1881)
- Aga Khan II – Shah Ali Shah (about 1830–1885), 47th hereditary Imam of Nizari Ismailis (12 April 1881 – 17 August 1885)
- Aga Khan III – Sir Sultan Mohammed Shah (1877–1957), 48th hereditary Imam of Nizari Ismailis (17 August 1885 – 11 July 1957)
- Aga Khan IV – Prince Shah Karim Al-Hussaini (1936–2025), 49th hereditary Imam of Nizari Ismailis (11 July 1957 – 4 February 2025)
- Aga Khan V – Prince Shah Rahim Al-Hussaini (born 1971), 50th hereditary Imam of Nizari Ismailis (4 February 2025 – present)

== See also ==
- Imamate in Nizari doctrine
- Imamate in Shia doctrine
- List of Ismaili imams
- Nizari Ismaili state
- Noorani family
