= Imamshah Bawa Dargah =

Imamshah Bawa Dargah (Urdu: امام شاہ باوا درگاہ) is a famous Shia Ismaili Dargah, in Pirana near the city of Ahmedabad in India. Pir Sadardin Imamshah Bawa, a Shia Ismaili Da'i founded the Satpanth Tariqa around 600 years ago, and taught tolerance, perennialism and syncretism of all religions, putting a particular emphasis on the syncretism of Islam and Hinduism. The Dargah consisted of a vast complex that contained the grave of Pir Sadardin, as well as several other graves, and a Mosque also existed in the complex. Until 1931, the complex was the private property belonging to the direct descendants of Pir Sadardin. The complex attracted devotees from religions other than Islam, such as Hinduism, and all 18 communities living in village of Pirana, belonging to various different castes and religions, all contain devotees of Pir Sadardin. The complex was demolished in the month of May, 2024 by the Hindu-right wing Bharatiya Janata Party led state government of Gujarat.
