= Hemant Chauhan =

Indian singer

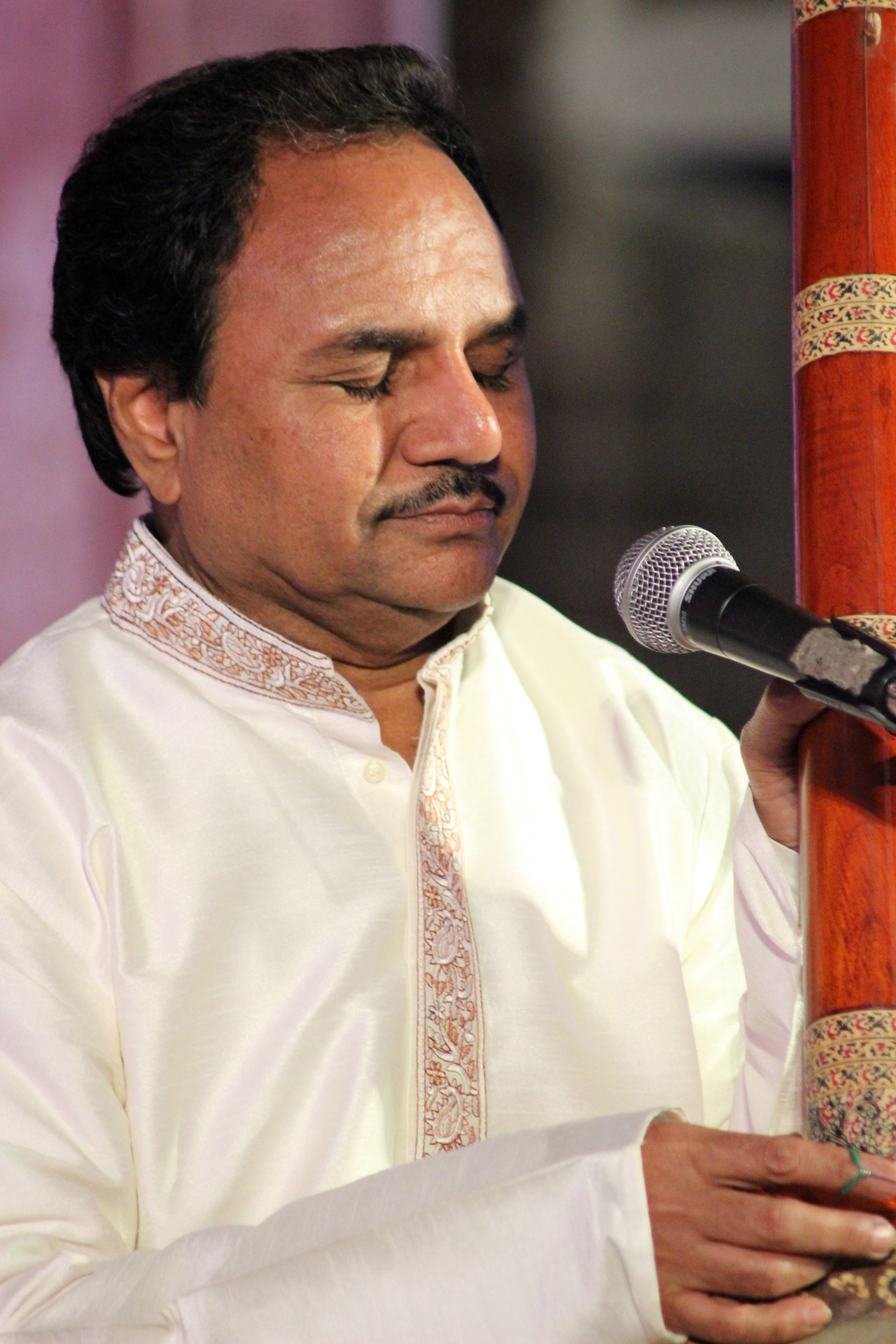
- Born: November 7, 1955 (age 70); Rajkot, India
- Years active: 1978–present
- Awards: Padma Shri

Hemant Chauhan is an Indian writer and singer associated and Padam Shri Award by Government of India 2023 with Gujarati literature and music.

== Early life ==
He was born on 7 November 1955 in Kundni village in Rajkot district of Gujarat. He specializes in Bhajan, religious and Garba songs and other folk genres.

On 9 October 2012, he received the 'Akademi Ratna Award 2011' and Padma Shri Award in 2023 by Government of India for his contributions to Gujarat's traditional folk music. He is frequently referred to as the Bhajan King of Gujarati Music, and is also considered to be one of the best singers of Sugam Sangeet. He has a huge fan base and following all over the world including India (mainly in Gujarat), United Arab Emirates, United Kingdom, United States and East Africa. His fan base outside India is made up of people of Gujarati heritage. With an extensive catalogue of hit songs and bhajans, his “Kathiya Wadi Lok Dayra and Bhajan Sandhya” concert tour in North America in early 2007 was a huge hit. He has released many albums of devotional music. He has the mastery in Gujarati Bhajans and he himself believes that he has gained popularity and fame by singing Gujarati Bhajans, especially the Bhajans of great Gujarati saint-poet Dasi Jivan. His first album 'Dasi Jivan na Bhajano' was released in 1978 and became a huge hit across Gujarat. Since then, he has sung more than 5000 bhajans and many other devotional items.

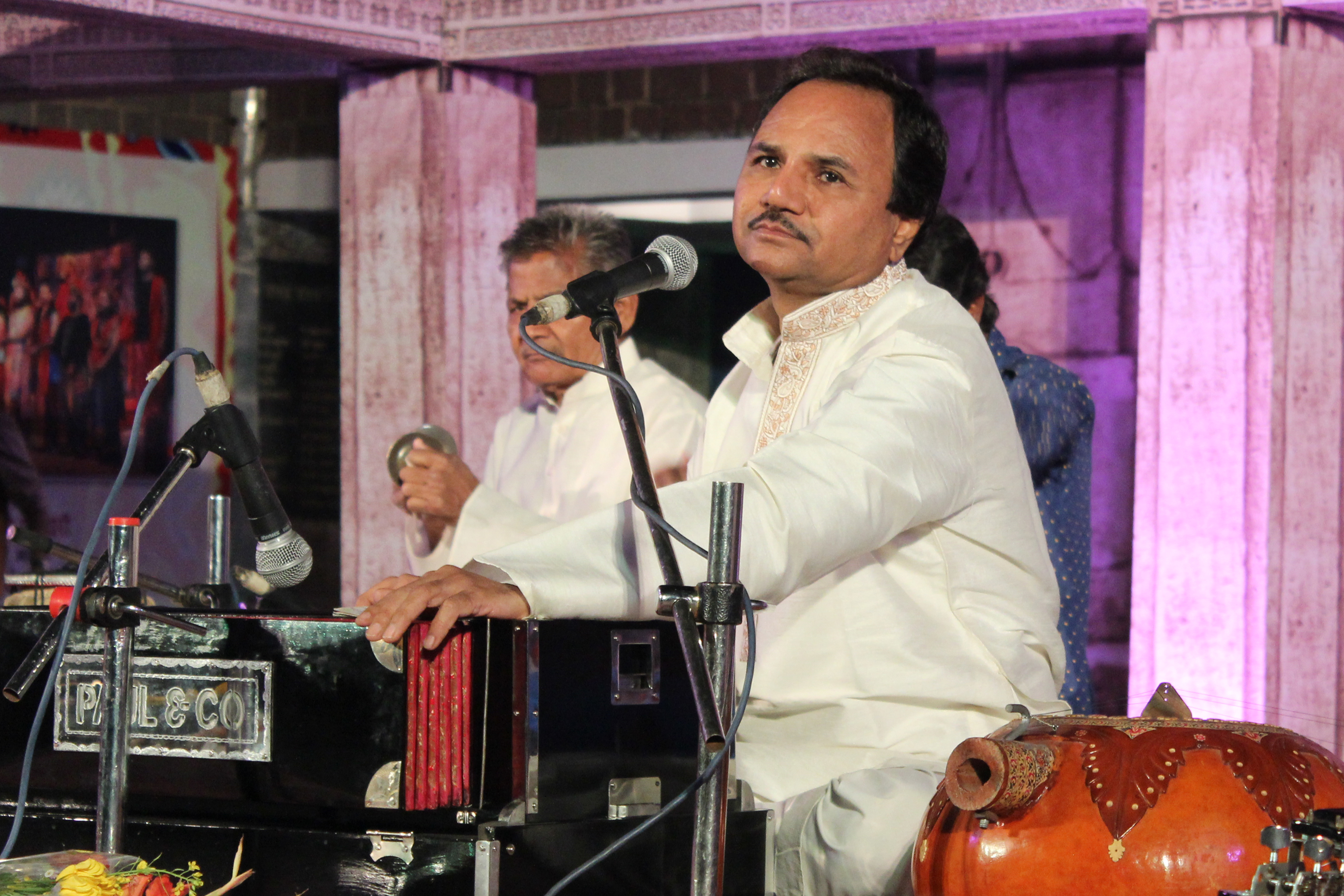
Hemant Chauhan performing at Bharat Bhavan in Gujarat Mahotsav at Bhopal February 2017

== Selected works ==
- Bharat no Bhimrao (Dr. B R Ambedkar)
- Bandharan kon lakhe (Dr. B R Ambedkar)
- Pankhida O Pankhida
- Om Namah Shivay - Shiv Dhun
- Shriman Narayan Narayan - Vishnu Dhun
- Hey Ram Hey Ram Dhun
- Om Mangalam Omkar Mangalam Dhun
- Om Mangalam Omkar Mangalam - Dwadash Jyotirling Song
- Bhajman Bam Bam Bholenath
- Stuti Namo Bhootnath
- Om Sai Mangalam
- Laher Lagi Bhajan Ni
- Dham Dham Nagara Re...
- Live In Leicester - Tu Rangai Jane Rang Ma
- Chotile Dakla Vagya
- Bhajan-Krishna-Devotional
- Shiv Tandav
- He Jagjanani He Jagdamba Hd Verslkion
- Hemant Chauhan - Tare Rahevu Bhada Na Makan Ma...
- Shrinathaji And Bhajan
- Pankhida Ne Aa Pinjaru
- Unchi Medi Te Mara Sant Ni Re
- Raakh Na Ramakada
- O Ma Meri
- Pyalo mein pidhel che bharpoor (Sant Dasi Jivan)
- Dekhanda koi aa dal mai (Sant Dasi Jivan)
- Kaleja katari, madi mune laine maari (Sant Dasi Jivan)
