= Pir Sadardin =

Founder of Satpanth

Pir Sadardin, also known as Pir Sadrudin or Pīr Ṣadr al-Dīn, was a fourteenth-century Shia Ismaili Da'i who founded the Satpanth Tariqa and taught tolerance, perennialism and syncretism of all religions, putting a particular emphasis on the syncretism of Islam and Hinduism. He is also attributed for converting the Khojas to Ismaili Islam.

== Life ==
He was ethnically Persian and the son and successor of Pir Shihab ad-Din, he was also one of the most prominent Ismaili authors of the 14th century. He was a contemporary of the Shia Ismaili Nizari Imam Muhammad ibn Islam Shah.

Born in Persia, Sadardin travelled to Khorasan and then later South Asia, where he settled in Sindh, in what is now southern Pakistan, and began to spread the Satpanth Tariqa in the area, as well as developing the Khojki script and writing Ginans. Pir Sadardin composed the previous Du'a, which was recited by Ismailis during several centuries, was very long and took almost half an hour to be recited. His "Gat Paj Ji Dua" also summarized the story of creation.

Pir Sadardin's Ginans were the last of the Ginans that have been studied today to mention Alamut and Daylam, suggesting that until this time, Ismaili presence – which is commonly thought to have been obliterated after the fall of Alamut to the Mongols in 1256 – had remained in the regions of Alamut and Daylam until his lifetime the 14th century. He authored an Ismaili book called Vinod.

He was buried in Taranda Muhamad Panah, near the town of Uch Sharif, Pakistan.

== Lineage ==
Pir Sadardin was a Sayyid who traced his lineage to Prophet Muhmmad through Ja'far al-Sadiq.

- Muhammad
- Fatima bint Muhammad
- Husayn ibn Ali
- Ali al-Sajjad
- Muhammad al-Baqir
- Ja'far as-Sadiq
- Sayyid lsmail Arizi Akbar
- Sayyid Muhammad Arizi
- Sayyid Ismail Sani
- Sayyid Muhammad Mansur Khakani
- Sayyid Ghalibuddin
- Sayyid Abdul Majid
- Sayyid Mustansirbillah
- Sayyid Ahmed Hadi
- Sayyid Hashim
- Sayyid Muhammad
- Sayyid Muhammad Sabzawari
- Sayyid Muhammad Mohibdin
- Sayyid Khaliqdin
- Sayyid Abdui Momin Shah
- Sayyid Noorbaksh lmamdin
- Sayyid Salahuddin
- Sayyid Shamsuddin Iraqi
- Sayyid Nasiruddin
- Sayyid Pir Shihabuddin
- Sayyid Pir Sadruddin.
