= Joseph Arnould =

British judge and writer (1813–1886)

Sir Joseph Arnould (12 November 1813 – 16 February 1886) was a writer and English judge who worked in British India.

== Life ==
Born at Camberwell, he was the only son of Dr. Joseph Arnould and his wife Elizabeth, daughter of Thomas Baily. He was the great-uncle of the actor, Laurence Olivier. He was educated at Charterhouse School and then Wadham College, Oxford, where he graduated with a Bachelor of Arts in 1836. Five years later, Arnould was called to the bar by the Middle Temple. For some time he wrote articles for the Daily News (UK) and in 1848 he published his first book. Arnould was appointed puisne judge at the Supreme Court of Judicature at Bombay in 1859, whereas he was created a Knight Bachelor. In 1862, as the Bombay High Court was inaugurated, he became one of its first judges. Arnould presided in the 1862 Maharaj Libel Case and the 1866 Aga Khan case and retired three years later in 1869.

A close friend of the poet Robert Browning, he won himself the Newdigate Prize, awarded by the University of Oxford in 1834. During his time with the Middle Temple, Arnould befriended also and shared rooms with Alfred Domett. In January 1841, he married Maria, daughter of H. G. Ridgway. She died in 1859 and Arnould married a second time in the following year. Arnould lived at White Cross House in Winterbrook, near Wallingford in Berkshire (now Oxfordshire). During his retirement, he moved to Italy and died at Florence on 16 November 1886.

The Arnould Scholarship at the University of Bombay was named in his honour.

== Family ==
He was married twice: first, in 1841, to Maria, eldest daughter of H. G. Ridgeway; and, secondly, in 1860, to Ann Pitcairn, daughter of Major Carnegie, C.B.

== Works ==
- Law of Marine Insurance (1848)
- The Judgement in the Khoja Case (1866)
- Memoir of Thomas, First Lord Denman, Formerly Lord Chief Justice of England (1873)
