= Satpanth =

Religious belief synthesizing Hinduism and Isma'ilism

Satpanth is a Sanskrit term, given to a diverse group of individuals who follow Pir Sadardin. Pir Sadardin Imamshah Bawa, was a Shia Ismaili Da'i who founded the Satpanth Tariqa around 600 years ago, and taught tolerance, perennialism and syncretism of all religions, putting a particular emphasis on the syncretism of Islam and Hinduism.

There are villages in Gujarat which are totally Satpanthi such as Pirana near Ahmedabad where Pir Sardardin is buried. Satpanthi Dargahs are known to be venerated with a stark contrast in the devotees, with Muslim-identifying visitors who may wear a hijab, and Hindu-identifying visitors wearing their traditional garb such as the sari.

Satpanth can be described as a synthesis of Hinduism and Isma'ilism as most who refer to themselves as Satpanthi claim they are Hindu or retain their Hindu names and traditions. This has resulted in a unique syncretism in which adherents strongly employ Hindu symbols, especially the Om and Swastika, keep Sanskrit names, and observe all mainstream Hindu religious occasions, while prayers can also include Persian and Arabic Duas.

== History ==
Pir Sadardin is credited with the conversion of the Khojas from the Hindu caste of the Lohanas located in Punjab, Rajasthan, and Gujarat in to the Satpanth Tariqa. He laid the foundation of the communal organization, built the first assembly and prayer halls and appointed the community leaders known as Mukhis. The founder of the Satpanth was Pir Sadardin Imamshah Bawa who broke with the Nizari Isma'ili Dawah in the 14th century by proclaiming himself the Da'i instead of Pir Tajuddin who was appointed as the Nizari Isma'ili Da'i for India and Sindh by the Nizari Isma'ili Imam Muhammad ibn Islam Shah.

Pir Sadardin was a prominent Shia Ismaili Da'i in India. The descendants of Pir Sadardin led the Satpanth and its branches. They were Sa'id Khan, Muhammad Shah and Shahji Miran Shah. Shahji Miran Shah's son and successor Sayyid Muhammad Shah along with his followers, especially among the Matiya Kanbis caste, launched a revolt and seized the fort of Bharuch. This revolt occurred around 1688/89 and was put down by Aurangzeb. The leadership of the Satpanth remained in the hands of the direct descendants of Shahji Miran Shah until Baqir Ali who died around 1835 and was the last Pir of the Aththiya. Shahji Miran Shah's wife Raji Tahira founded a separate branch of the Satpanth. The Satpanth then split into various groups that later identified as either Hindu or Muslim in the present day.

The foundational narrative of the Gupti community of Bhavnagar references Pir Sadardin's Satpanth teachings. It discusses the pilgrimage of their Hindu ancestors to the sacred city of Kashi to bathe in the Ganges in search of forgiveness for their sins. On their way to Kashi, they encountered Pir Sadardin near Ahmedabad, who explained the futility of the journey and that they could bathe in the Ganges at that very place. He explained the mysteries of the Satpanth to pilgrims, who joined the path of their new spiritual guide. Satpanth leaders were given an audience (Deedar) with the Ismaili Imam Sir Sultan Muhammad Shah Aga Khan III in 1939. Details of this encounter are recorded in the Khojki book The Jewel of Mercy, which describes how the Imam told the Satpanth leaders that Pir Sadardin had correctly shown them recognition of the Imam of the time, in accordance with his own beliefs. The Imam further urged them to perform esoteric worship (Bāṭinī ‘Ibādah), never pretentiously, and to never cause pain to anyone.

Pir Sadardin married the daughter of Shah Muhammad Shah II Bakhri, the Sultan of the Gujarat Sultanate, who gave birth to Pir Sayyid Nur Muhammad Shah. Pir Sadardin died in 1520 CE and was buried in Pirana, Gujarat. It is said that he abjured traditional Ismailism and created a community far more syncretic with Hinduism, Buddhism and Jainism. The reason for this schism is often attributed to legends of a quarrel with his kin or a shift in his own philosophy and theology. Weighing up the extant evidence, it appears that he remained ingrained in Ismailism and demonstrated a high degree of loyalty to the Ismaili Imams, until his death, and never took any other route in his ambition. He remains famous and revered by his followers for encouraging the preservation of Hindu and other indigenous cultures and customs, in stark contrast to other Islamic and Christian missionaries. He had four sons, Sayyid Alam Shah, Sayyid Ali Shah, Sayyid Bakar Shah and Sayyid Nur Muhammad Shah, and a daughter called Shams Khatun.

== People ==
The people of the Satpanth consist mostly of high-caste converts of Lohana origin. Others are from Rajput, merchant, and farming castes including those that claim to be from Patidar and Patel communities belonging to Western and Northwestern India. Athiya Patel's are not generally accepted as authentic Patidars, and adopted the surname for social mobility. Some are migrants from neighbouring Indian states—including Madhya Pradesh, the Punjab and Rajasthan—who now reside in Gujarat (mainly the Kutch and commercial areas) and Mumbai. Followers of Satpanth are also present in significant numbers in Jalgaon, Nandurbar and Dhule districts of Northern Maharashtra. The followers are divided into two essential groups, one group identifies as Hindu and follows the leadership of the Kakas as priests, the other group identifies as Muslim Shia Ismaili, which makes Pir Sadardin a figure of common veneration by both groups.

Satpanth is used as a means of self-identification for millions of resident and non-resident Indians, and due to the varying degrees of its syncretic structure, there are various sects who reject a singular leadership and elect local committees. The leadership of the Muslim identifying group of Satpanthis is led by the descendants of Pir Sadardin are known as Sayyids. Other groups will appoint a single Mukhi or a group of Mukhis to represent their leadership.

Satpanth followers that are more aligned with traditional Ismailism, called Murīds, believe that the physical form of the Imam is merely a vessel for the spiritual Imam which is Nūr or spiritual light. They also believe that his Farmans (orders), his Shabd (word) and his formless being are the real Imam. These separate concepts of an esoteric Imam and an exoteric Imam are called "Batini Imam" and "Zahiri Imam".

Satpanth devotees believe in "Nurani Deedar," which is the vision of light one achieves when one views the True Imam. This, again, has an esoteric and an exoteric meaning.

It is customary in each and every Jama'at Khana that a row of community leaders and title holders (male and female) should sit facing the rest of the congregation. There is a row of individuals, sitting with their backs to the side wall, in the male as well as the female section. Both these sections are kept side by side in one large hall. Hence, a row of males would face and prostrate before the females, and vice versa. Looking at individuals of the opposite gender across the hall, and even the passing of objects between genders, is highly discouraged if not forbidden. If an object must be passed such as a utensil, the person must get up and leave it in the middle or end of the hall, where it will eventually picked up by the intended recipient. The reading of Holy Du'a is undertaken while sitting on the floor on one's knees, or while sitting cross-legged as with other sects, with a Misbaha or Mala being picked up at intervals. Any individual of any age who is fully versed in the Holy Du'a may lead the prayer.

The main shrine of Satpanth used to be visited by all adherents of Satpanth, regardless of religious identity, and consisted of a vast complex which contained the grave of Pir Sadardin, as well as several other graves, and a Mosque also existed in the complex. Until 1931, the complex was the private property belonging to the direct descendants of Pir Sadardin. The complex attracted devotees from religions other than Islam, such as Hinduism, and all 18 communities living in village of Pirana, belonging to different castes and religions, all contain devotees of Pir Sadardin. The complex was demolished in the month of May 2024 by the Hindu right-wing Bharatiya Janata Party led state government, following several clashes and attacks by Hindus, which was opposed by both Hindu and Muslim identifying members of Satpanth.

== Scriptures ==
The holy writ of the Satpanth tradition is the collection of Ginans written by various medieval Pirs, most notably Pir Sadardin and Pir Satgur Nur.

The Ismaili texts explain that before the formation of the misty stars which make up the galaxies, there was the frightful darkness of pre-eternity (Dhandhukār), when the Incomprehensible One (God) was engrossed in contemplation. Before the universe came to be, he revealed his everlasting gnosis (Amar Ginān) to the True Guide. This is when the True Guide became the conductor of a Symphony of Gnosis and began his assembly to the Path of Truth (Satpanth), by summoning all souls to salvation through Ginān.
