= Aga Khan II =

Member of the Iranian royal family (1830–1885)

His Highness Aga Khan II
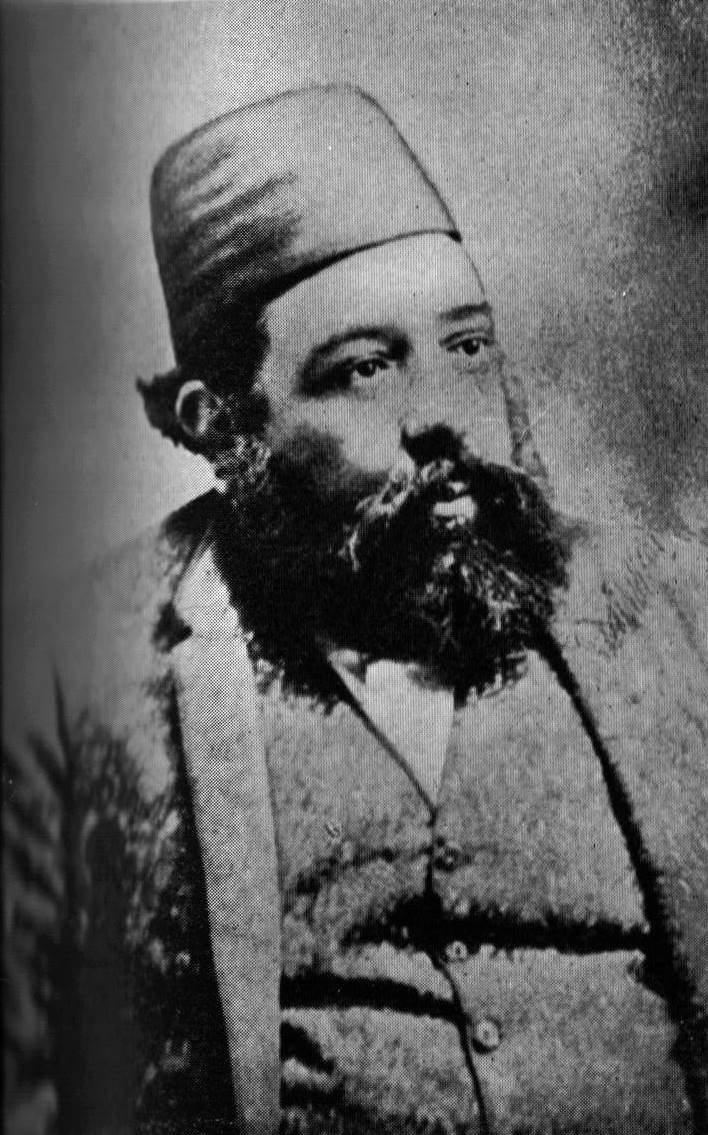
- Aqa Ali Shah in 1885

47th Hereditary Imam of the Nizari Isma'ilism Muslim
- In office 12 April 1881 – 17 August 1885
- Preceded by: Aga Khan I
- Succeeded by: Aga Khan III

Member of Bombay Legislative Council
- In office 1880 – 1885

President of Muhammadan National Association
- In office 1881 – 1885

Personal life
- Born: Prince Aga Ali Shah; 1830 Mahallat, Sublime State of Iran
- Died: 17 August 1885 (aged 54–55) Poona, Bombay Presidency, British India
- Resting place: Najaf, Ottoman Iraq
- Spouse: Maryam Sultana; Nawab A'lia Shams al-Muluk
- Children: Sultan Muhammed Shah (successor); Shihab al-Din Shah; Nur al-Din Shah
- Parents: Hasan Ali Shah (father); Sarv-e Jahan Khanum (mother)

Religious life
- Religion: Shia Islam
- Denomination: Isma'ilism
- School: Nizari Ismaili
- Lineage: Fatimid

Prince Aqa Ali Shah (Persian: آقا علی شاه, romanized: Āqā ʿAlī Shāh; 1830 – 17 August 1885), known as Aga Khan II (Persian: آغا خان دوّم, romanized: Āghā Khān Duwwūm), was the 47th hereditary imam of the Nizari Isma'ili Muslims. A member of the Iranian Qajar dynasty, he became the Imam in 1881. He was the second Nizari Imam to hold the title Aga Khan.

== Early life and family ==
Aqa Ali Shah was born in 1830 at Mahallat in Iran. He was the eldest son of Aga Khan I and the only surviving male issue of his father with Sarv-e Jahan Khanum (Sarv-e Jahān Khānum, d. 1882). Aqa Ali Shah was a member of the Iranian royal family, as his mother was the daughter of Fath-Ali Shah Qajar, the second ruler of the Qajar dynasty. His rank as a prince of the royal family was also recognized by Naser al-Din Shah Qajar when Aqa Ali Shah's father died. Naser al-Din himself carried out a ceremony performed among Iranian princes to mark the end of mourning of deceased relations. In addition, Naser al-Din Shah sent a robe of honour and the emblem of the Kiani Crown studded with diamonds to Aga Ali Shah as a sign of the Shah's relationship with the Aga Khan's family.

He is descended from the Fatimid caliphs of Egypt. He spent his early years in Mahallat; however, his father's attempts to regain his former position as governor of Kerman made residence there difficult, and so Aqa Ali Shah was taken to Iraq with his mother in 1840. There he studied Arabic, Persian, and Nizari Ismaili doctrine, and soon gained a reputation as an authority on Persian and Arabic literature, as a student of metaphysics, and as an exponent of religious philosophy. In the late 1840s, changed political circumstances allowed Aqa Ali Shah to return to Iran where he took over some of his father's responsibilities. In 1853, Sarv-e Jahan Khanum and Aqa Ali Shah joined Aga Khan I in Bombay. As his father's heir apparent to the Ismaili Imamat, Aqa Ali Shah frequently visited various Ismaili communities in South Asia, particularly those in Sind and Kathiawar.

== Ismaili imamate ==
Aqa Ali Shah became Imam of the Ismailis upon the death of his father in 1881, also inheriting his father's title of Aga Khan. He continued the cooperative relationship with the British established during his father’s time and was appointed to the Bombay Legislative Council during the tenure of Governor Sir James Fergusson.

Shah had prior experience engaging with Ismaili communities in South Asia, having undertaken visits on behalf of his father. In 1874, he was appointed to a commission tasked with proposing amendments to personal laws affecting his community, particularly in cases where followers were subject to overlapping interpretations of Muslim and Hindu legal codes.

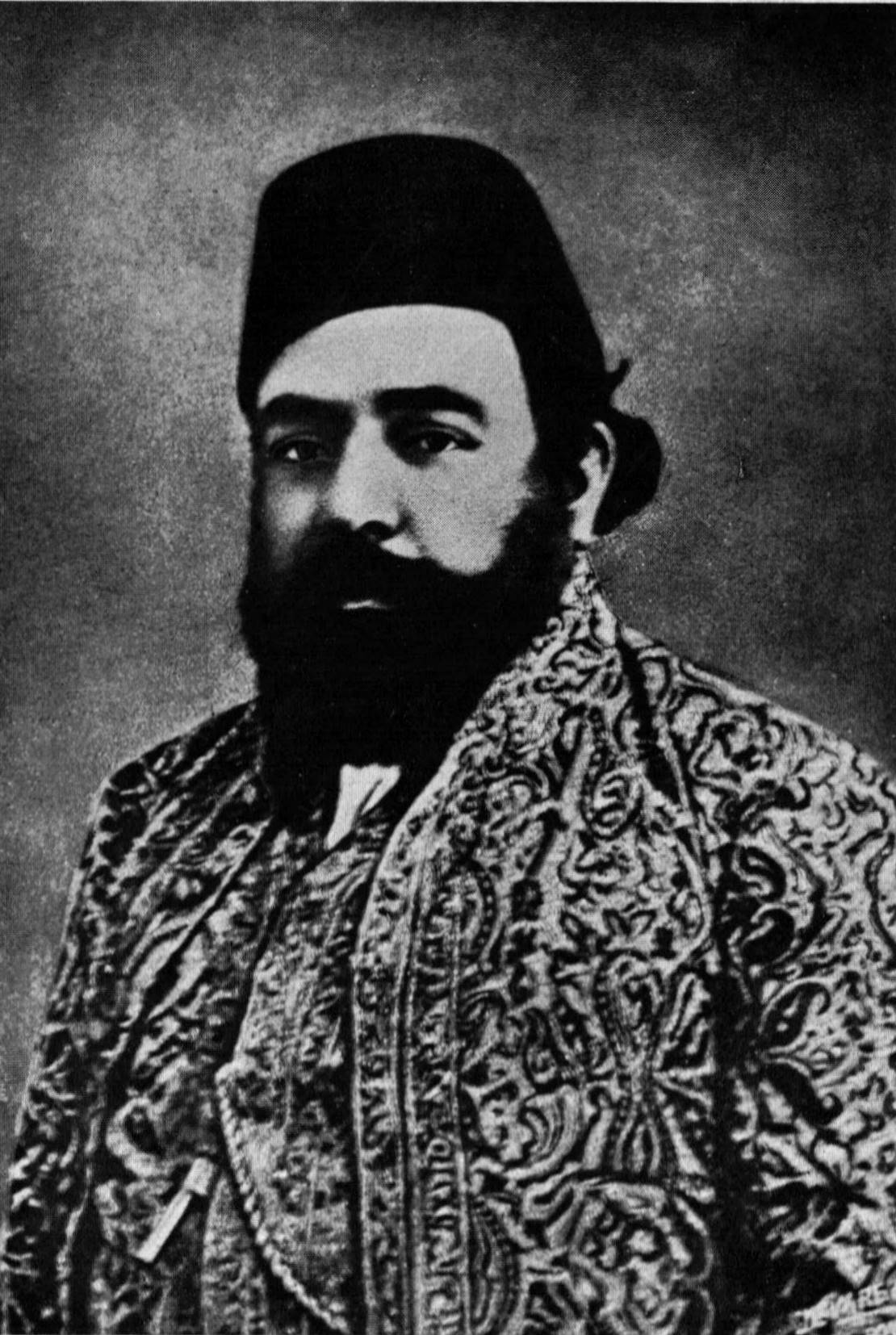
Aga Khan II c. 1881-1885

During his brief imamate of approximately four years, he supported the establishment of schools in Bombay and other locations, and arranged financial aid for community members in need. He also expanded communication with Ismaili communities outside South Asia, including those in the upper Oxus region, Burma, and East Africa. He received formal recognition for his public and communal roles, with contemporary accounts noting the regard in which he was held by segments of the community.

== Close relations with other Muslim communities ==
Aqa Ali Shah was elected president of the Muhammadan National Association, a role he held until his death. In this capacity, he participated in the promotion of educational and philanthropic initiatives, some of which extended beyond the Ismaili community and were aimed at broader segments of the Indian Muslim population.

Like his father before him, Imam Aqa Ali Shah maintained close ties with the Nimatullahi Sufi order. This relationship was no doubt facilitated by the common Alid heritage that Aqa Ali Shah and the Nimatullahis shared: both Shah Nimatullah Wali (d. 1430–1), the eponymous founder of the order, and Aqa Ali Shah traced their ancestry to the Shia Imam Ja'far al-Sadiq and, hence, to Ali. It appears that the affiliation between the Nimatullahis and the Nizari Imams can be traced at least as far back as the 18th century to the 40th Nizari Imam, Shah Nizar, who had close connections with the order.

Prior to embarking for India, Aqa Ali Shah had developed close relations with the leader of one of the Nimatullahi branches, Rahmat Ali Shah, who had been a guest of Aga Khan I in Mahallat in 1833. After Rahmat Ali Shah's death in 1861, Aqa Ali Shah often sent money from India for the recitation of the Qur'an at his grave in Shiraz. Aqa Ali Shah also had close ties with Rahmat Ali Shah's uncle as well as one of Rahmat Ali Shah's successors, Munawwar ‘Alī Shāh (d. 1884). Aqa Ali Shah received a number of important visitors belonging to the Nimatullahi order, including Rahmat Ali Shah's son Muḥammad Ma‘Ṣūm Shīrāzī, who visited India in 1881 and stayed with Aqa Ali Shah for a year. Another prominent figure of the Nimatullahi order received by Aqa Ali Shah was Safi Ali Shah, who first went to India in 1863 at Aqa Ali Shah's invitation.

== Marriages and children ==
Not much is known about Aqa Ali Shah's first two wives, both of whom died in Bombay. His first marriage with Maryam Sultana had two sons. The eldest, Shihab al-Din Shah (also known as Aqa Khalil Ullah) was born around 1851-2 and wrote some treatises in Persian on Muslim ethics and Ismaili spirituality. He died in December 1884 of a chest complaint while still in his early thirties, and was buried in Najaf. The second son, Nur al-Din Shah, who was the full-brother of Shihab al-Din Shah, died around 1884–5 in a riding accident at Poona while still in his youth. It was said that, having lost two of his sons, Aqa Ali Shah died of a broken heart. After the death of his first wife, Aqa Ali Shah married a second time, but lost his second wife as well.

In 1867, Aqa Ali Shah married Shams ol-Moluk, daughter of Khorshid Kolah Khanum (one of Fath-Ali Shah Qajar's daughters) and Mirza Ali Mohammad Nezam al-Dowleh, an Iranian nobleman, the grandson of Hajji Mohammad Hossein Isfahani, the Grand Vizier of Fath Ali Shah Qajar of Iran. Shams ol-Moluk was also the niece of Mohammad Shah Qajar of the Qajar dynasty. The couple had three sons, two of whom died in infancy. Their surviving son and successor, Sultan Muhammad Shah, later became Aga Khan III.

== Sports and hobbies ==
Aqa Ali Shah's father began the family tradition of racing and breeding horses in Bombay. The first Aga Khan owned some of the world's finest Arabian horses, which were inherited by Aqa Ali Shah. Sultan Muhammad Shah later noted that when his father died, "he left a large and imposing sporting establishment in being—hawks, hounds, and between eighty and ninety racehorses".

Aqa Ali Shah was not only a skilful rider, but also an avid sportsman and hunter, and was particularly famous for his hunting of tigers in India. He was known to have pursued tigers on foot and to have had such a deadly shot that he killed at least forty tigers in this manner.

== Death and legacy ==
On one particular day of water-fowling near Poona in 1885, Aqa Ali Shah contracted pneumonia. Describing the incident, his son Sultan Muhammad Shah later wrote, "There were several hours' heavy rain, the going underfoot was heavy and wet, and my father was soaked to the skin. He caught a severe chill which turned swiftly and fatally to pneumonia." He died eight days later, after an imamate of four years, and was buried in the family mausoleum in Najaf on the west bank of the Euphrates, near Kufa and the tomb of Imam Ali, one of the holiest places in the world for Shia Muslims. The mausoleum is also the resting place of Aqa Ali Shah's grandfather, Shah Khalil Ullah, who was the forty-fifth Imam of the Nizari Ismailis, and for whom the mausoleum was first constructed.

The death of Aga Khan II evoked much grief within the Muslim community. He was succeeded by his son, Sultan Muhammad Shah, who became Aga Khan III.

== Titles and honours ==
The titles Prince and Princess are used by the Aga Khans and their children by virtue of their descent from Fath-Ali Shah Qajar of the Iranian Qajar dynasty. The title was officially recognised by the British government in 1938.

The title of 'His Highness' was initially granted by the British Monarch to the Ismaili Imams dating back in mid 1800s, to the first Aga Khan, in recognition as a religious leader of global importance and his role as spiritual head of the Ismaili community resides in Commonwealth countries.

Aga Khan II of the Ahl al-Bayt Banu Hashim Clan of the Banu Quraish Born: 1830 C.E Died: 1885 C.E.
Shia Islam titles
Preceded by Hassan Ali Shah	47th Imam of Nizari Ismailism; 1881–1885	Succeeded by Muhammad Shah
