= Ginans =

Shia Ismaili Muslim hymns

Ginans (Urdu: گنان, Gujarati: ગિનાન; derived from Sanskrit: ज्ञान jñana, meaning "knowledge") are devotional hymns or poems recited by Shia Ismaili Muslims.

Literally meaning gnosis, ginans are the devotional literature of the Nizari Ismailis of South Asia, spanning topics of divine love, cosmology, rituals, eschatology, ethical behavior and meditation. Ranging from three verses to hundreds of pages, ginans are attributed to the Pirs, who were second only to the Imams in the Ismaili hierarchy.

It was originally an oral rendition mostly by Pirs, first among whom to come to South Asia was Pir Satgurnur in the 12th century. Ginans are composed in many languages of South Asia, especially Gujarati, Urdu, Punjabi, Sindhi, Burushaski and many more. They are based on verses from the Quran. Like Ginans, Qaseedas are recited in Arabic, Persian or Tajik by Ismailis in Central Asia, Iran and Syria. Ismailis from the subcontinent recite these as well as Arabic and Persian qasidas which are recited before or after the prayer in the Jama'at Khana. Ginan Central is a web portal developed at the University of Saskatchewan Library to safeguard Ginans and promote research and education.

Ginans are devotional hymns recited by the Nizari Ismaili communities in South Asia. The recitation of Ginans is not restricted to just Nizari Ismailis evidenced by the recitation of ginans by many established non-Nizari Ismaili singers such as Abida Parveen who recited the ginan Ya Ali Khub Majalis in the presence of the 49th present and living Imam of the Nizari Ismailis, His Highness Aga Khan IV, the accessibility to view current transcripts and translations of ginans, and the academic literature written on ginans which is made accessible to the larger public.

Although ginans can be recited, studied, and listened to by non-Nizari Ismailis, Ginans hold a special role in the cultural practice and rituals of Nizari Ismailis, specifically the community of Khojas, a caste of South Asians of whom the majority now identify as Nizari Ismaili. The Khojas, contextualized by the history of these Ismaili Pirs and Sayyids, came to follow the Satpanthi tradition; Satpanth means “True Path.”

== History ==
Ginan attributed to Pir Shams from Mahan.

Recited in Jama'at Khanas throughout the world, Ginans were preached by Ismaili Pirs and Sayyids in the South Asian region. The Ginans are a unique as literature because while they were meant to spread the Ismaili doctrine and basic theological principles to South Asians, they incorporated local elements of the region which inadvertently included what we now label as Hindu references. Perhaps the clearest connection to Ginans and what we now conceive of as Hindu tradition is the theme of Kalki which is the tenth incarnation of Vishnu (Dasa Avatara). In Ginan literature, the first Shia Imam, Ali, cousin and son-in-law of Muhammad, is likened to this tenth incarnation which is re-labeled as Nakalanki. It is because of these pluralistic elements in the Ginans that Khojas identified neither as Hindus nor as Muslims which lead to complications as the modern conception of religion created rigid boundaries of these religious identities.

Ismailis view Ginans as a means through which to understand the message of the Qur’an and get closer to the essence of the Divine Light. Therefore, even though Ginans are often an outwardly practice (zahir), they provide the vessel through which the inner meaning (batin) can be understood.

According to Wladimir Ivanow, a prominent Russian scholar on Ismailism, Ginans hold a profound significance for Ismailis, representing the Haqiqah or the ultimate truth. As such, the inner essence of Ginans is revered as supreme knowledge within the Ismaili tradition. This esteemed knowledge is believed to have been bestowed upon the family of Muhammad, known as the Ahl al-Bayt, so that the exclusive authority to impart guidance through Ginans lies with the Imams (direct descendants of Muhammad) or the Pirs (supreme representatives of the Imam).

Some Ginans are also written in the style of the Virahini; that is in the perspective of a woman who is waiting with desire to be meet and be united with her beloved who is a metaphor for God.

There are many important figures in the tradition of Ginans. These include Pir Shams, Pir Sadr ad-Din, Pir Hasan Kabir ad-Din, Nur Muhammad Shah, Imam Begum Shah, etc. These individuals wrote and actively contributed to the Ginan tradition.

While the message and text of Ginans remains important, important academic has been done to demonstrate that just as the text, theological importance, and ritualistic practice is important to Ginans, the musicality and performance level of Ginans as a rite in Jama'at Khanas is significant as well.

== Ginanic Discourse ==
In their expression of the Satpanthi doctrine, ginans draw on multiple traditions prevalent in western India, including the Vaishnava Hindu, Sufi, sant and bhakti traditions. These traditions provide the frameworks within which ideas central to Satpanth, such as the authority of the Imam, come to be articulated.

The Vaishnava Hindu discourse is especially discernible in earlier ginans such as the Das Avatara, in which an equivalence is established between the Ismaili concept of imam and the Hindu concept of avatara. The Ismaili imam (proclaimed to be living in the west) is represented as the long-awaited tenth incarnation of the Hindu god Vishnu. In such ginans, Satpanth comes to be represented as the culmination of the Vaishnava Hindu tradition.

Many ginans formulate their teachings within a Sufi framework, using Sufi terminology to explain and discuss concepts central to the Satpanth tradition. The interaction between Sufi and Ismaili traditions particularly in Iran has a long history traceable to the 13th century. Reiterating this relationship, ginans not only describe Ismaili Imams and their representatives in Sufi terms, but also regularly evoke concepts, such as didar (vision of the divine), nur (light), and batin (esoteric, as opposed to zahir, exoteric), central to the Sufi tradition.

A third discourse discernible in the ginans is that of the sants, “a group of lower-caste poet-saints who were part of a powerful anti-ritual and anti-caste movement” influential in India. Satpanth can be thought of as one of the many formal organizations called panths (paths) that crystallized around some of these sants. Ginans utilize much of the “idiom of sant poetry”, and demonstrate a similar concern with “challenging the efficacy of ritualism and rote learning as paths to salvation”.

Finally, ginans draw on the bhakti tradition, an influential movement of Hindu devotionalism, in describing the relationship of devotion between disciples and the Imam. Ginans portray the Imam as an “object of love and veneration” in describing this relationship in the language of bhakti poetry. Many ginans describe the human soul as the virahini, a female figure longing for her beloved, best exemplified by Radha in her longing for the Hindu god Krishna. The beloved to whom the human soul must turn with such devotion is almost always identified as the Imam. In line with the female portrayal of the human soul, many ginans are composed in the female voice, even though their authors may be male.

== Cultural and religious significance ==
Some Ginans are recited by the Nizari Ismaili Muslim community on specific occasions. One notable occasion is during the Ghat Pat ceremony, a distinctive Ismaili ritual described in Ginans, in which specific Ghat Pat Ginans, both seated and standing, are recited. During this ceremony, holy water blessed by the Imam is ceremonially distributed to the congregation from a pot (ghat) placed on a low wooden table (pat) in the Jama'at Khana.

Many Ginans explore the theme of death, making them particularly relevant during funeral ceremonies. Thus, a rich selection of Ginans is recited during funeral rites, offering comfort and spiritual guidance to the bereaved.

Similarly, a specific Ginan is recited on the birthday (Salgirah) of the current Imam, another on the occasion of his accession to the Imamat (Imamat Day), and so on.

== Example translation of a Ginan ==
Sahebaji tun more man bhave: Verses I-VIII

God,
My heart is fond of you.
I think of no-one else.
None else pleases my heart.
Oh my lord,
My heart is fond of you.
So readily, my lord,
You give me
Whatever I ask of you.
You indulge me
In so many ways,
My lord.
In all four ages,
I went about,
Looking hard.
I found none
To match you, my lord.
My lord, my heart
Is fond of you.
Come, come,
My maiden friends,
Let us go
To view the groom.
He's the one, the beloved
I've attained.
He comes to my home,
The beloved,
He but for whom
A minute is hard to pass.
How should we call him
Unhappy -
He whose lord
Is one such as this?
How should we find fault
With the merciful?
What's written
In our karma
Is what we shall have.
Ram and Raheman
Are but one Deity.
Of this mystery,
The fool is quite unaware.
Says Saiyad Mohamadshah:
I am bonded to you,
My lord.
Leaving you,
At what other door
Am I to knock?
My lord,
My heart is fond of you.
I think of no-one else.
None else pleases my heart.
God,
My heart is fond of you.

== Notable singers ==
- Pandit Rattan Mohan Sharma
- Hemant Chauhan
- Aly Sunderji
- Khursheed Nurali (Sheerazi)
- Anaar Kanji
- Shamshu Jamal
- Alidina Jamal
- Yasmin Rayani
- Niranjan Rajyaguru
- Shezad Roy
- Shaheen Chino Khan
- Faisal Kapadia
- Abida Parveen
- Salim Merchant
- Sulaiman Merchant
- Allan Fakir
- Hemant Chauhan
