= Abu Dharr Ali =

15th-century imam

Abū Dharr ʿAlī (Arabic: أبو ذر علي), also known by the regnal name of Nūr al-Dīn Muḥammad (Persian: نور الدین محمد), was the 35th imam of the Qasim-Shahi branch of the Nizari Isma'ili community.

He succeeded his father, al-Mustansir Billah III, upon his death in 1498, at Anjudan. He apparently married a sister or daughter of the Safavid shah of Persia, Tahmasp I. Despite this close connection to the rulers of Persia however, the Safavids began to persecute all other varieties of Shi'ism that rivalled their own Twelver creed, and Tahmasp launched a persecution of the Nizaris during the reign of Abu Dharr Ali's son and successor, Murad Mirza.

== Sources ==
- Daftary, Farhad (2007). The Ismāʿı̄lı̄s: Their History and Doctrines (Second ed.). Cambridge: Cambridge University Press. ISBN 978-0-521-61636-2.

Abu Dharr Ali of the Ahl al-Bayt Banu Hashim Clan of the Banu Quraish Born: ? C.E Died: 1509 C.E.
Regnal titles
Shia Islam titles
Preceded by Al-Mustansir Billah III	35th Imam of Nizari Isma'ilism (Qasim-Shahi line); 1498–unknown	Succeeded by Murad Mirza
