= Abd al-Salam Shah =

Imam

ʿAbd al-Salām Shāh (Persian: عبد السلام شاه; died 1493/4) was the 33rd imam of the Qasim-Shahi branch of the Nizari Isma'ili community.

== Life ==
Originally named Mahmud, he reportedly received the honorific name 'Abd al-Salam' (lit. 'Servant of Peace') from his father, al-Mustansir Billah II, on account of the wisdom he displayed. An epistle of a contemporary poet mentions that he was also known as 'Salam Allah'.

He succeeded his father upon the latter's death c. 1480, at Anjudan. According to oral Nizari tradition, he died in 1493/4 and was succeeded by his son, Gharib Mirza. Like his father, he tried to persuade the Nizari communities of the rival Muhammad-Shahi branch in Badakhshan and Afghanistan to recognize his leadership.

== Works ==
A number of writings are attributed to him:

- Most famously, an oft-repeated ode addressed to the 'seekers of [spiritual] union', i.e. those seeking after the divine gnosis of God. According to Abd al-Salam Shah, this is achievable only through complete submission to the will and guidance of the Imam, who alone is privy to the hidden, esoteric truths of the Quran.
- Panj Sukhan kih Hadrat-i Shah Islam farmuda and ('Five Discourses Uttered by Shah Islam'), a brief essay on the moral and ritual obligations of the faithful.
- Farman-i Shah Abd al-Salam ('Decree of the Imam Abd al-Salam'), written in 1490 and addressed, according to Vladimir Ivanov, to the Muhammad-Shahi followers in Badakhshan and Kabul. According to Shafique Virani, this is the "only known Qasimshahi source explicitly testifying to a rivalry between the two lines" of Nizari imams, but its current whereabouts are unknown.
- Bandi az Shah Abd al-Salam Shah Mustansir bi'llah ('A Poem of Shah Abd al-Salam [ibn] Shah Mustansitr bi'llah'), which may be the same as the ode to the 'seekers of union'.

== Sources ==
- Daftary, Farhad (2007). The Ismāʿı̄lı̄s: Their History and Doctrines (Second ed.). Cambridge: Cambridge University Press. ISBN 978-0-521-61636-2.
- Virani, Shafique N. (2007). The Ismailis in the Middle Ages. A History of Survival, A Search for Salvation. Oxford and New York: Oxford University Press. ISBN 978-0-19-531173-0.

Abd al-Salam Shah Banu Hashim Clan of the Banu Quraish Born: ? C.E Died: 1493 C.E.
Regnal titles
Shia Islam titles
Preceded by Al-Mustansir Billah II	33rd Imam of Nizari Isma'ilism (Qasim-Shahi line); 1480–1493/4	Succeeded by Gharib Mirza
