= Da'i Anjudani =

Da’i Anjudani (died c. 15th century CE) was a Nizari Ismaili poet who hailed from Anjudan, and lived in the time of the Ismaili Imam Mustansir b’illah II (died 1480 CE) and likely died during the reign of the Timurid ruler of Herat Sultan Husayn Mirza Bayqara . As the term ”da’i” denotes a high rank in the Ismaili hierarchy (hudūd), the poet’s name suggests that this figure likely occupied a prominent place in it and that the title da’i was conferred upon him by the imam, rather than simply being his pen name (takhallus).

== Life and works ==
One of the earliest mentions of Da’i Anjudani is among the record of poets compiled by Iskandar Beg Munshi during the reign of Shah Tahmasp I in the mid-16th century. Here, he is described as a prominent scholar. His brother, Malik Tayfur is described in the same light as a pious and devoted man and is also noted also as a world traveler. Da’i is portrayed as a self-disciplined and righteous figure, “like a dervish”. Da’i is noted for his lucid poetry, in particular his odes (qaṣā’id) and love verses (ghazaliyyāt). Both Da’i and his brother Malik appear in Lutf ‘Ali Beg’s anthology of poets entitled Ātishkada.
