= Mustansiriyya =

Mustansiriyya (Arabic: مستنصرية, romanized: Mustanṣiriyya, lit. 'Mustansirite; of or relating to al-Mustansir') may refer to:

- Mustansiriyya Madrasa, a medieval-era scholarly complex in Baghdad, Iraq
- Al-Mustansiriya University, a public university in Baghdad, Iraq
- Mustansirite Hardship, a political crisis in Fatimid Egypt between 1064 and 1071 CE
