= Al-Musta'sim =

37th and last Abbasid Caliph (r. 1242–1258)

al-Musta'sim Billah المستعصم بالله
- Khalīfah; Amir al-Mu'minin
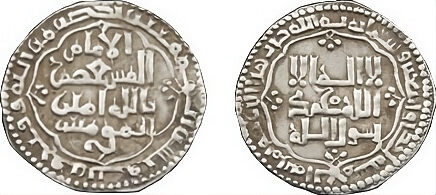
- Dinar minted under al-Musta'sim's rule

37th Caliph of the Abbasid Caliphate
- Reign: 5 December 1242 – 20 February 1258 (15 years 2 months 15 days)
- Predecessor: al-Mustansir
- Successor: Position abolished al-Mustansir II (caliph of Cairo)
- Born: 1213; Baghdad, Abbasid Caliphate (present-day Iraq)
- Died: 20 February 1258 (aged 45); Baghdad, Abbasid Caliphate (present-day Iraq)
- Burial: Al-Musta'sim Billah Mosque, Adhamiyah, Baghdad, Iraq
- Consort: Bab Bachir
- Issue: Abu al-Abbas Ahmad; Abu Nasr Muhammad; Abu al-Fada'il Abd al-Rahman; Abu al-Manaqib Mubarak; Fatimah; Khadijah; Maryam; A'ishah; Karimah
Names
- Abū Aḥmad ʿAbd Allāh ibn al-Mustanṣir al-Mustaʿṣim bi-llāh أبو أحمد عبد الله بن المستنصر المستعصم بالله
- Dynasty: Abbasid
- Father: al-Mustansir
- Mother: Hajir
- Religion: Sunni Islam

Abū Aḥmad ʿAbd Allāh ibn al-Mustanṣir (Arabic: أبو أحمد عبد الله بن المستنصر, 1213 – 20 February 1258), better known by his regnal title al-Mustaʿṣim bi-llāh (Arabic: المستعصم بالله, lit. 'He who holds trust through God'), was the 37th and last Abbasid caliph of Baghdad. He held the title from 1242 until he was killed by the Mongols following the Siege of Baghdad in 1258.

== Biography ==
Abu Ahmad Abdallah was a son of the Abbasid caliph al-Mustansir, born to his Abyssinian concubine Hajir around 1213. After the death of his father, he succeeded to the throne in late 1242 as al-Musta'sim billah. After his enthronement, he imprisoned several members of the Abbasid family who could potentially be rivals to his claim, among them his uncle Ahmad ibn al-Zahir.

=== Arbitration of the Mamluk–Ayyubid Dispute ===
In 1249, the Ayyubid sultan of Egypt and Syria as-Salih Ayyub died during the ongoing seventh crusade, and his son al-Muazzam Turanshah succeeded him. After a brief reign, he was killed by as-Salih's mamluk troops, who, lacking dynastic legitimacy of their own, proclaimed as-Salih's widow, Shajar al-Durr, as the new sultan. The Ayyubid emirs in Syria refused this succession, and the emir of al-Karak rose in open revolt. The emirs in Damascus handed the city over to the power Ayyubid emir of Aleppo, an-Nasir Yusuf, who became a powerful symbol of Ayyubid loyalists against Mamluk usurpation. The Mamluks in Cairo responded by arresting the Ayyubid loyalists in Egypt.

Al-Musta'sim also refused to recognize Shajar al-Durr as sultan on account of her gender, reportly sending a message "If you do not have men there tell us so we can send you some." Al-Musta'sim's refusal was a great setback to the Mamluks, as the custom during the Ayyubid era was that the Sultan could gain legitimacy only through the recognition of the Abbasid caliph. To this end, the Mamluks decided to install their leader Aybak as sultan. He married Shajar al-Durr, who abdicated in his favor after a reign lasting just three months.

To secure further legitimacy and satisfy the Ayyubid loyalists, Aybak also announced that he was merely a representative of the caliph and installed an Ayyubid child al-Ashraf Musa as a figurehead. This did not satisfy the Ayyubids, and they entered into an armed conflict with the Mamluks. Through negotiation and al-Musta'sim's mediation, the militarily superior Mamluks reached an agreement with Ayyubids that gave them control over southern Palestine, including Gaza, Jerusalem and the Syrian coast. By 1254, Aybak had accumulated enough power over his political opponents that he deposed al-Ashraf Musa and took the throne directly. After his death, his child son al-Mansur Ali succeeded him, with real power held by a mamluk of Aybak, Qutuz. His political consolidation saw the death of Ayyubid state and its replacement by a Mamluk regime which would dominate the southern Mediterranean for decades.

=== Reign during Mongol Advance ===
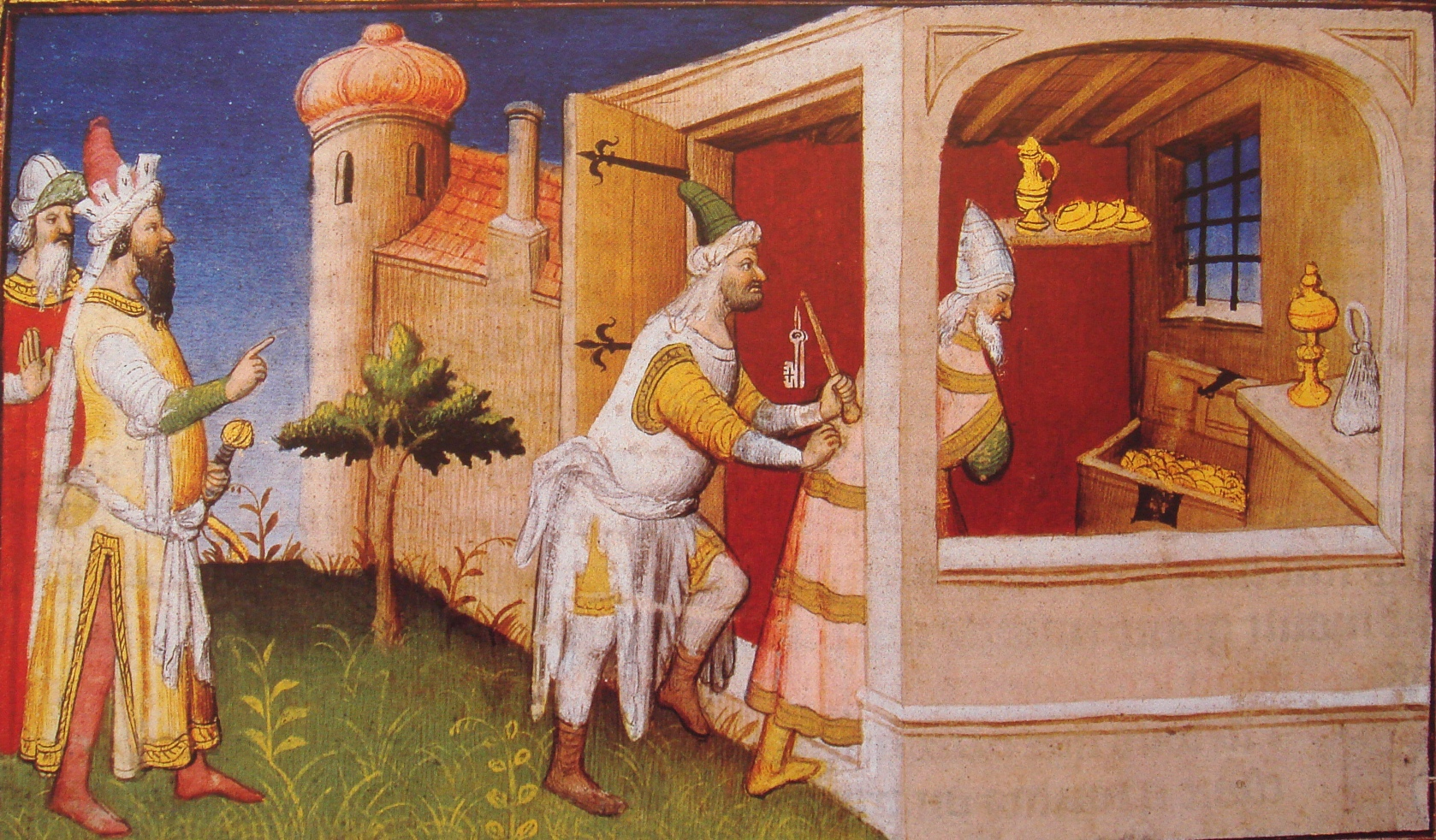
Marco Polo claimed that Hulagu (left) imprisoned al-Musta'sim among his treasures to starve him to death. This is widely considered unhistorical.

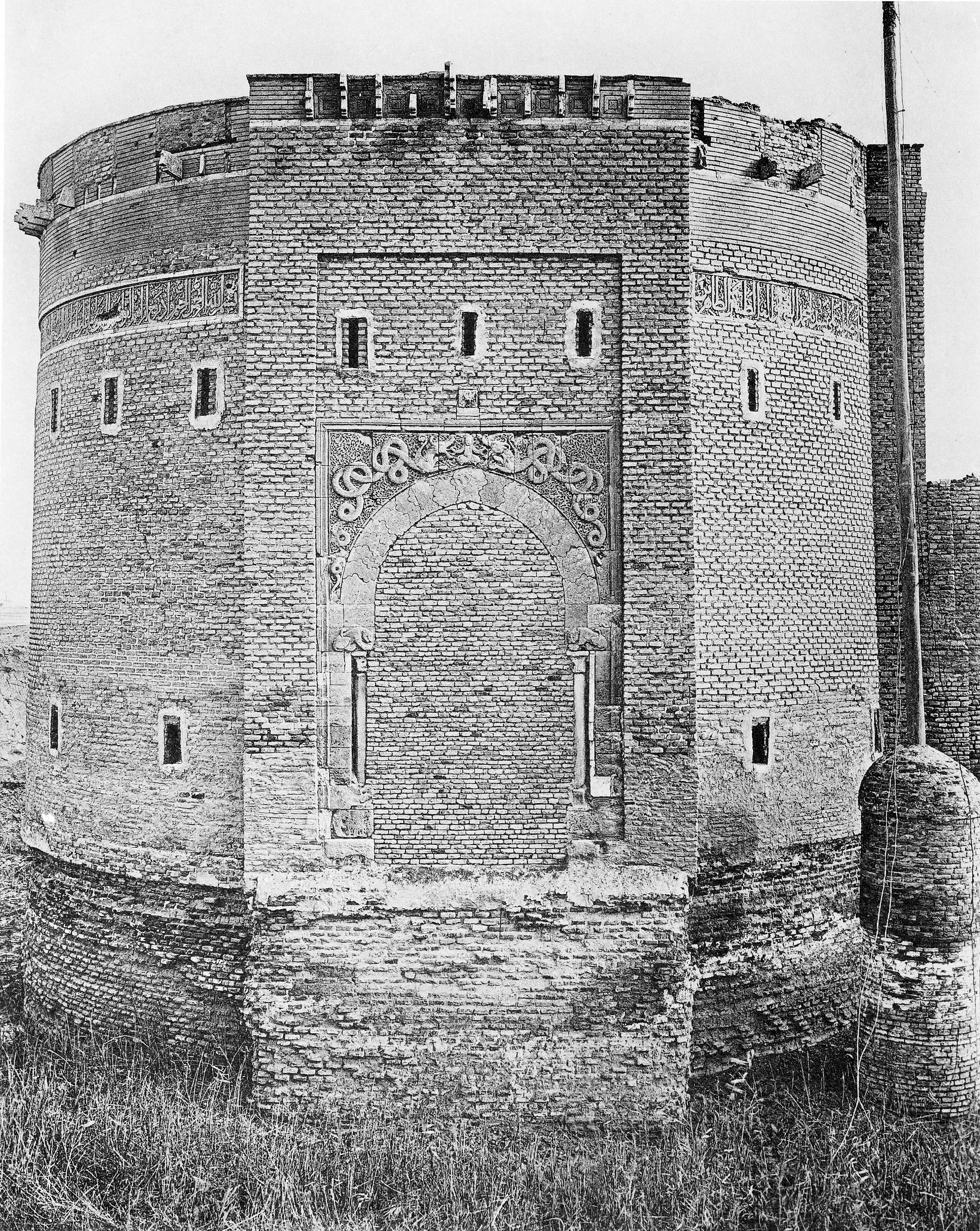
The Talisman Gate, built in 1220-1221 by al-Nasir, protected the eastern walls of Baghdad at the time of the siege.

By the time al-Musta'sim took the caliphal throne, the Mongol empire had fully conquered the Khwarizmian empire and shared a border with the Abbasid state. In 1255, the Mongol general in-charge of their Iranian territories, Hulegu Khan, forced al-Musta'sim to lend his forces for his campaign in the Alamut region. By 1258, the Mongol khagan Möngke had ordered Hulegu to subjugate the Abbasid state. Hulegu send word to al-Musta'sim, demanding his acquiescence to the terms imposed by Möngke. Al-Musta'sim refused, in large part due to the influence of his advisor and grand vizier, Ibn al-Alkami. Historians have ascribed various motives to Ibn al-Alkami's opposition to submission, including treachery and incompetence, and it appears that he lied to the caliph about the Mongol strength, assuring him that if the capital of the caliphate was endangered by a Mongol army, the Islamic world would rush to its aid.

Al-Musta'sim's reply to Hulegu was found menacing and offensive by the Chingisid prince, who broke off further negotiation and began assembling his forces. Al-Musta'sim meanwhile also hastily assembled his own force of 20,000 cavalry, though they were ill-equipped and poorly disciplined. Although the caliph technically had the authority to summon soldiers from other sultanates subordinate to him, his taunting opposition had lost him the loyalty of the Mamluks, and the Ayyubid emirs he supported, were busy preparing their own defenses.

=== Downfall and death ===
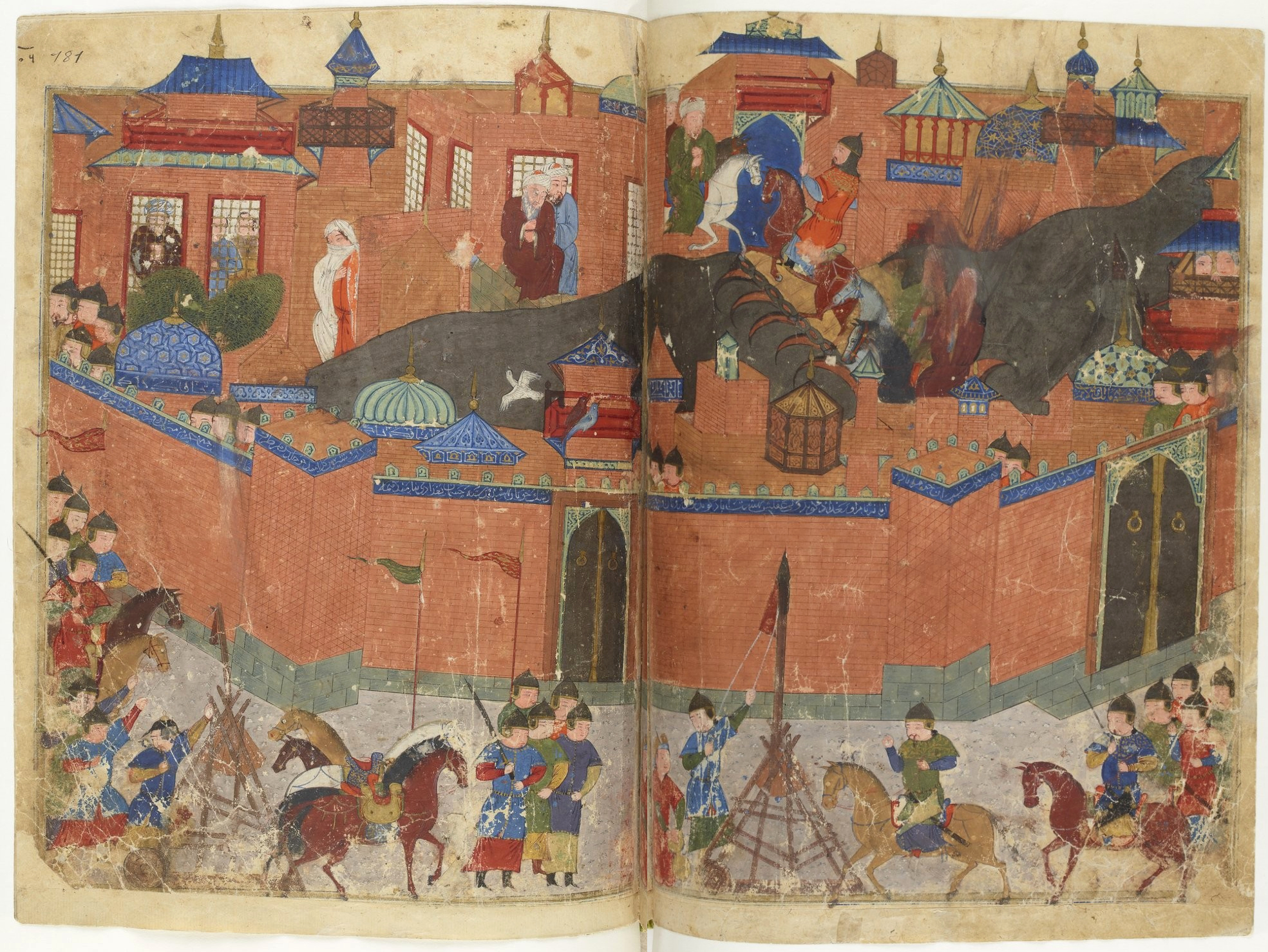
Hulegu and his army besieging the walls of Abbasid Baghdad in 1258

By 11 January, the Mongols established themselves on both banks of the Tigris River to form a pincer around the city. Seeing no other option, al-Musta'sim sent out his cavalry, who were decisively defeated. On 29 January, the Mongol army breached dikes along the Tigris River and flooded the ground behind the Abbasid forces, trapping them. By 5 February, the Mongol siege engines had allowed them to seize a significant portion of the defenses. Realizing that his forces had little chance of retaking the walls, al-Musta'sim attempted to open negotiations, but Hulegu refused. Around 3,000 of Baghdad's notables were sent to negotiate but were murdered.

On 10 February, city surrendered, but the Mongols did not enter the city until three days later, beginning a week of massacre and destruction. Mosques, palaces, libraries and hospitals were looted and destroyed. Claims have been made that the Tigris ran red from the blood of the scientists and philosophers killed. Al-Musta'sim was captured and forced to watch as his citizens were murdered, his treasury plundered, and his harem sold into slavery. Baghdad was left depopulated and ruined and it took several decades to only gradually recover some of its former glory.

On 20 February, the last Abbasid caliph was executed. According to most accounts, the Mongols did not want to shed "royal blood", so they wrapped him in a rug and rode their horses over him. The Travels of Marco Polo reported an alternative but likely fictional acccount of his execution. Upon finding the caliph's great stores of treasure which could have been spent on the defense of his realm, Hulagu Khan locked him in his treasure room without food or water, telling him "eat of thy treasure as much as thou wilt, since thou art so fond of it."

=== Aftermath ===
The fall of Baghdad came as a shock to the whole Muslim world. Saadi Shirazi composed two qasidas (odes), one in Arabic and the other in Persian, which grieved over the fall of the city. Berke Khan, the ruler of the Golden Horde, who had converted to Islam in 1252, was highly enraged at Hulegu's sack of Baghdad. He reportedly sent a message to Mongke Khan (not knowing Mongke had already died in China) that "[Hulegu] has sacked all the cities of the Muslims. With the help of God I will call him to account for so much innocent blood." Although hesitant at first out of Mongol brotherhood, the economic situation of the Golden Horde led him to declare war against the Ilkhanate, ushering in the Berke–Hulegu war.

== Family ==
Al-Musta'sim's son Abu Nasr Muhammad was born to his concubine Bab Bashir. He also had three other sons, Abu al-Abbas Ahmad, Abu al-Fada'il Abd al-Rahman and Abu al-Manaqib al-Mubarak. After the sack of Baghdad, all sons were killed except al-Mubarak, who was spared on account of his young age. He was taken captive and transported northeast to the Ilkhanate capital of Maragheh, where he lived out the remainder of his life. Al-Musta'sim also had several daughters, including Fatimah, Khadijah, Maryam, A'ishah and Karimah.

== Legacy ==
Al-Musta'sim's death marked the end of the caliphate as a political and religious entity. After the sack of Baghdad, many members of the Abbasid dynasty fled west in an effort to be recognized for their caliphal claims. One of these, al-Musta'sim's uncle, made his way to Cairo and was installed by Mamluk sultan Baybars as caliph al-Mustansir. After he was killed in an attempt to retake Baghdad, another distant relative al-Hakim I was installed by Baybars. The line of caliphs beginning with him lasted till the Ottoman conquest of Egypt in 1517, but they were merely symbolic figures with no political power.

For almost a century after his death, many Muslim rulers, in particular the Sultans of Delhi, continued to posthumously put his name on their coins to indicate them as being deputies to the caliph. Alauddin Khalji ceased this, instead adding the more general Yamin-ul-Khilafat Nāsir Amīri 'l-Mu'minīn (The right hand of the Caliphate, the helper of the Commander of the Faithful). This practice continued until the reign of Tughlaq sultans, who instead began adding the name of the Abbasid Caliphs of Cairo after seeking formal investitures from them.

== See also ==
- Yaqut al-Musta'simi a well-known calligrapher and secretary of al-Musta'sim
- Mongol invasions of the Levant

== Sources ==
- al-Maqrizi (1997). al-Sulūk li-maʿrifat al-duwal wa-l-mulūk. DDārr al-Kutub.
- Ibn al-Furat; le Strange (1900). "The Death of the Last Abbasid Caliph, from the Vatican MS. of Ibn al-Furat". Journal of the Royal Asiatic Society. 32: 293–300.
- Banister, Mustafa (2021). The Abbasid Caliphate of Cairo, 1261–1517: Out of the Shadows. Edinburgh: Edinburgh University Press. ISBN 9781474453363.
- Holt, P. M. (1984). "Some Observations on the 'Abbāsid Caliphate of Cairo". Bulletin of the School of Oriental and African Studies. 47 (3). University of London: 501–507. doi:10.1017/s0041977x00113710. JSTOR 618882. S2CID 161092185.
- Losensky, Paul (2000). "Saʿdi". Encyclopaedia Iranica.

Al-Musta'sim Abbasid dynasty Cadet branch of the Banu Hashim Born: 1213 Died: 20 February 1258
Sunni Islam titles
Preceded by Al-Mustansir	Caliph of Islam; Abbasid Caliph; 5 December 1242 – 20 February 1258	Vacant Mongol sack of Baghdad Title next held by Abu’l-Qasim al-Mustansir
