= Al-Mustansir =

Al-Mustansir المستنصر
- Pronunciation: almustansar (Arabic) mʌstənsɪɹ̩ (English)
- Gender: Male

Origin
- Origin: Semitic (Arabic)
- Meaning: He who seeks victory in God (Al-Mustansir billah)
- Region of origin: Arabia (Middle East)

Al-Mustansir, more fully al-Mustansir billah (Arabic: المستنصر بالله, romanized: al-Mustanṣir bi-llāh, lit. 'he who seeks victory in God'), is a Muslim regnal surname and may refer to:

The regnal title was used by:

- al-Mustansir Billah (1029–1094), eighth Fatimid Imam-Caliph
- Al-Mustansir Billah II (r. 1463/4–1480), 32nd Nizari imam
- Al-Mustansir Billah III (r. 1493/4–1498), 34th Nizari imam
- Sayf al-Dawla ibn Hud al-Mustansir (r. 1145–1146), Muslim ruler of Valencia and Murcia
- Al-Mustansir I (1192–1242), penultimate Abbasid caliph in Baghdad from 1226 to 1242
- Al-Mustansir II (died 1262), first Abbasid caliph of Cairo for the Mamluk Sultanate between 1261 and 1262
- Muhammad I al-Mustansir (1228–1277), Hafsid ruler of North Africa and self-declared Caliph
- Abu Faris Abd al-Aziz I (r. 1366–1372), Marinid sultan of Morocco
- Abu al-Abbas Ahmad al-Mustansir (r. 1374–1384, 1387–1393), Marinid sultan of Morocco
- Ghabdula Chelbir Mustansir (r. 1178–1225) was the last ruler of Volga Bulgaria

== See also ==
- Al-Mustansiriya University, Baghdad
