= Al-Mustansir Billah II (Nizari imam) =

15th-century imam in Nizari Isma'ili

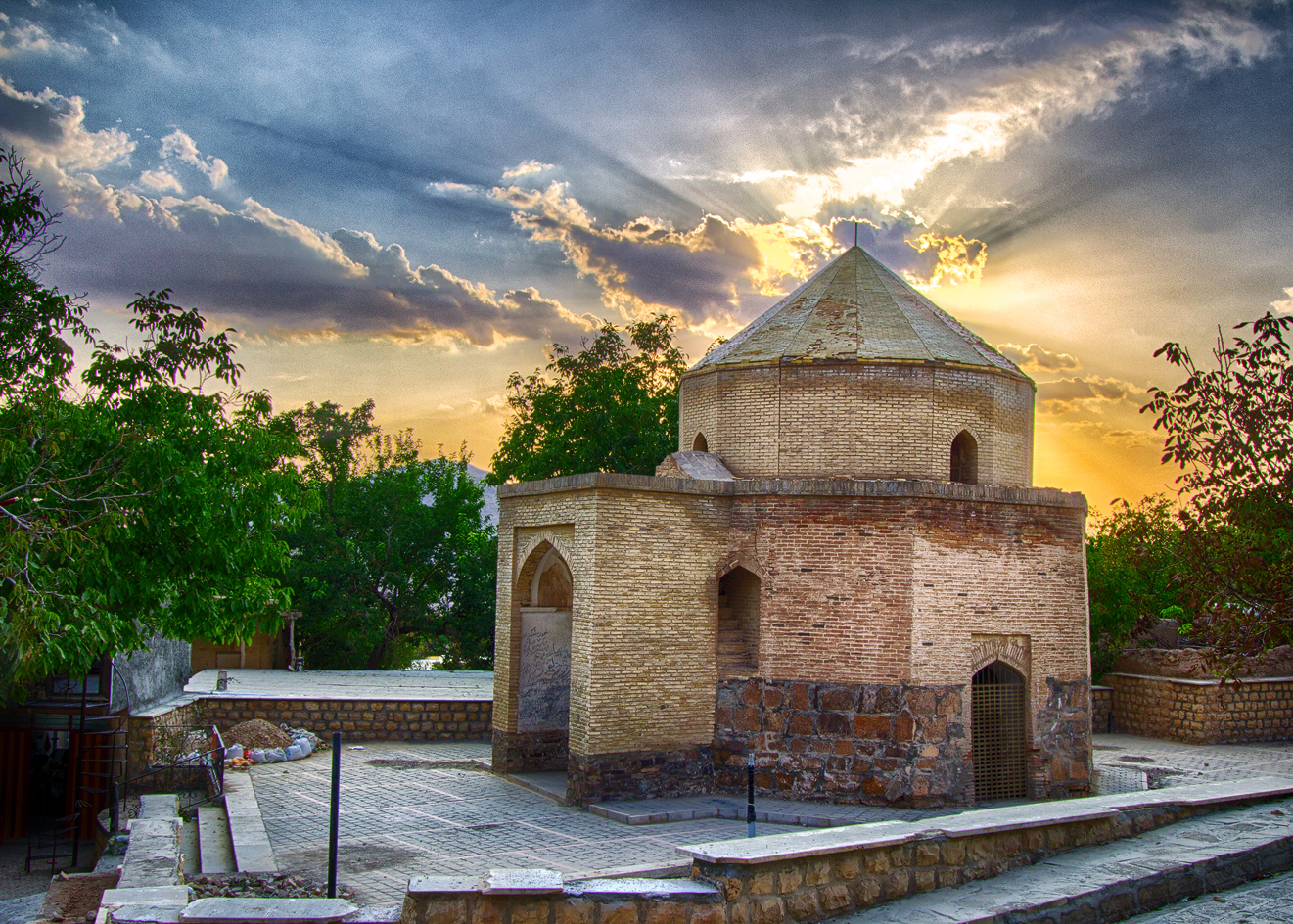
Mausoleum of al-Mustansir II at Anjudan, known locally as the tomb of Shah Qalandar

ʿAlī Shāh, known by the regnal name al-Mustanṣir Billāh II (Arabic: المستنصر بالله الثاني علي شاه; 1480-1463/4), was the 32nd imam of the Qasim-Shahi branch of the Nizari Isma'ili community. His reign initiated the Anjudan period of Nizari history, which was marked by a revival of Nizari teachings.

== Background ==
The history of Nizari Isma'ilism in the centuries following the fall of the Nizari Isma'ili state to the Mongol Empire in 1256 is particularly obscure, both due to lack of scholarly attention and due to lack of reliable sources, as the Nizari faithful were left scattered and without central leadership and often had to dissimulate their true faith due to persecution by Sunni rulers. During the 14th century, moreover, the line of succession to the imamate split into two rival factions, the Muhammad-Shahi and Qasim-Shahi lines, of which the former initially gained the allegiance of the majority of the Nizari communities and were more active in the historical record. The Qasim-Shahi line, on the other hand, is shrouded in obscurity, and even their first imams are known almost only as names, with few reliable dates or information about their lives.

== Life ==
Ali Shah, known by the regnal name al-Mustansir Billah II, hearkening back to the 11th-century Fatimid caliph of the same name, was the son of the third Qasim-Shahi imam (and 31st overall), Muhammad ibn Islam Shah ibn Qasim Shah, and succeeded his father as imam c. 1463/4.

He was the first of his line known to have settled in the village of Anjudan in central Iran. Anjudan appears to have been a significant Qasim-Shahi centre already during the late 14th century, and was attacked by Timur in 1393. The settlement of the Qasim-Shahi imams in Anhjudan began a period of revival of the Nizari traditions under the Qasim-Shahi line, both in a reinvigoration of their missionary activity as well as a renewed literary output of the sect. Al-Mustansir II sent missionaries (da'is) to places as far as what is now Afghanistan.

Al-Mustansir II died in or shortly before 1480, and was buried in an octagonal mausoleum, known by the locals as that of Shah Qalandar. The mausoleum is also the earliest evidence attesting to the presence of the Qasim-Shahi imams in the area. In the aftermath of the Mongol conquests, modern scholars since the time of Henry Corbin and Vladimir Ivanov consider that the Nizaris often hid their true identity behind the mantle of Sufism. The name Shah Qalandar has thus been regarded as a Sufi cover name for al-Mustansir II. The historian Shafique Virani questions the general validity of this assumption, pointing out that the name Shah Qalandar is never used in Isma'ili sources, and is only known as a reference to his mausoleum.

Al-Mustansir II was succeeded by his son, Abd al-Salam Shah. A collection of sermons, the Pandiyat-i javanmardi ('Admonitions on Spiritual Chivalry'), is generally ascribed to al-Mustansir II, supposedly compiled during Abd al-Salam Shah's tenure; but Virani argues that it belongs to the imamate of al-Mustansir III, better known as Gharib Mirza.

== Sources ==
- Daftary, Farhad (2007). The Ismāʿı̄lı̄s: Their History and Doctrines (Second ed.). Cambridge: Cambridge University Press. ISBN 978-0-521-61636-2.
- Virani, Shafique N. (2007). The Ismailis in the Middle Ages. A History of Survival, A Search for Salvation. Oxford and New York: Oxford University Press. ISBN 978-0-19-531173-0.

Al-Mustansir Billah II Banu Hashim Clan of the Banu Quraish Born: ? C.E Died: 1480 C.E.
Regnal titles
Shia Islam titles
Preceded by Muhammad ibn Islam Shah	32nd Imam of Nizari Isma'ilism (Qasim-Shahi line); 1463/4–1480	Succeeded by Abd al-Salam Shah
