= Murad Mirza =

Imam of the Nizari Ismaili Shia Islam community

Murād Mīrzā (Persian: مراد ميرزا; 1509-1514?-1574) was the 36th Imam of the Nizari Isma'ili Shi'a Muslim community.

He succeeded his father Abu Dharr Ali, upon his death in 1509, at Anjudan. A politically active Imam, Murad Mirza had a large following. He is also known to have had close relations with the founder of Safavid Iran, Ismail I.

== Life ==
Ali Shah, surnamed Shah Murad or Murad Mirza lived in Anjudan. He had also retained his close relations with Shah Ismail cemented by his father. His mode of living, his dress and food were characterised by a rare simplicity. He was a politically active Imam, possibly alongside the Nuqtavi Shia group, and had a large following. Murād Mīrzā did not always operate from the Nizari base of Anjudan. As a result of his activeness, he acquired followers in Kashan and other central Persian areas.

The Ottoman sultan Selim I (1512-1520) began his long march to Azerbaijan after putting 40,000 Shias to death in his dominions. He reached the plain of Chaldiran and the outbreak of war occurred in 920/1514. He inflicted a defeat to Shah Ismail in the Battle of Chaldiran. Ottoman firepower, consisting of 200 cannon and 100 mortars was brought into play with devastating effect. After suffering heavy casualties, the Safavid artilleries were forced to break off the engagement. When Ismail left the battlefield, Salim did not pursue him. Later, he marched to Tabriz, the Safavid capital, which he occupied in 922/1517. Caterino Zeno, the Venetian ambassador writes in "Travels in Persia" (p. 61) that, "If the Turk had been beaten in the battle of Chaldiran, the power of Ismail would have become greater than that of Tamerlane, as by the fame alone of such a victory he would have made himself absolute lord of the East." Later, the Mamluks of Syria and Egypt similarly remained wedded to their cavalry, and were also defeated by the Ottomans.

The effect of the Safavid defeat at Chaldiran was the loss of the province of Diyar Bakr, which was annexed to the Ottoman Empire in 921/1516. Shah Ismail went into mourning after his defeat. During the remaining ten years of his reign, he never once led his troops into action in person. He did not devote his attention to the affairs of the state as in the past. On the contrary, he seems to have tried to drown his sorrows by wine. His abdication of his responsibilities in regard to the personal direction of the affairs of state gave certain officials the opportunity to increase their own power. The clash between the Qizilbash and the Iranian soldiers began to be a threat to the Safavid kingdom.

Kizilbash were the Turkomans, who were distinguished for wearing red pointed caps, which they had begun to wear in the time of Shaykh Haydar (1456-1488), the father of Shah Ismail; and thus they became known as Qizilbash "Red Heads". They shaved their beards but let their moustaches grow. The Kizilbash constituted the backbone of the Safavid army. It seems probable on that juncture that Shah Ismail had generated a close tie with the Ismaʾili Imams in Anjudan, and granted them the title of Amir al-Umra. There is its another reason that the Ismaʾilis had joined the Safavid army in Khorasan, who had repulsed the aggressive advance of the Uzbeks in 916/1510. Shah Ismail had most possibly planned to seek the martial aids from the Khorasani Ismaʾili warriors to crush the uprising in his military if required. He therefore, maintained cordial relation with the Imams of Anjudan. However, Ismaʾil died in 930/1524.

It is said that Muharram was an ideal month for the Ismaʾili pilgrims visiting Anjudan. They carried usually a small tazia (replica of Imam Hussain's tomb) and placed it in front of the caravan and passed through the teeth of the bitterest and aggressive places in Shiʿi garbs. They put the tazia at the entrance of Anjudan, and took it again while leaving the town.

Imam Murad Mirza died in 920/1574 in Anjudan and was succeeded by his son, Khalil Allah I.

=== Capture and execution ===
In 1573, due to the threat posed by the Imam, the second Safavid emperor, Tahmasp I, ordered the governor of Hamadan, Amir Khan Musilu, to go to Anjudan to capture Murad Mirza. Amir Khan proceeded to Anjudan, and while killing a large number of the Imam's followers and taking much booty, was unable to capture him. However, the Imam was soon captured and imprisoned, but again escaped, this time with the aid of a sympathetic high-ranking Safavid official named Muhammad Muqim. With the help of his followers, the Imam was able to escape to Kandahar. However, while in Afghanistan, he was once again captured by the Safavids. This time there would be no escape, and after being brought before Shah Tahmasp he was executed alongside Muhammad Muqim in 1574.

== Sources ==
- Daftary, Farhad (2007). The Ismāʿı̄lı̄s: Their History and Doctrines (Second ed.). Cambridge: Cambridge University Press. ISBN 978-0-521-61636-2.
- http://www.ismaili.net/histoire/main.html

Murad Mirza of the Ahl al-Bayt Banu Hashim Clan of the Banu Quraish Born: ? C.E Died: 1574 C.E.
Regnal titles
Preceded by Abu Dharr Ali	36th Imam of Nizari Ismailism ?–1574	Succeeded by Khalil Allah I
