= Al-Musta'sim Billah Mosque =

Sunni mosque in Baghdad, Iraq

- Location of the mosque in Baghdad

Religion
- Affiliation: Sunni Islam
- Ecclesiastical or organisational status: Mosque and shrine
- Status: Active

Location
- Location: al-A'dhamiyya, Baghdad, Baghdad Governorate
- Country: Iraq
- Interactive map of Al-Musta'sim Billah Mosque
- Coordinates: 33°22′17″N 44°21′48″E

Architecture
- Type: Mosque architecture
- Style: Abbasid; Modern Iraqi
- Completed: c. 1258 CE (mausoleum); 2005 (current structure)

Specifications
- Capacity: 200 worshippers
- Interior area: 1,000 m^{2} (11,000 sq ft)
- Dome: One (shrine only)
- Minaret: One
- Minaret height: 30 m (98 ft)
- Shrine: One: al-Musta'sim

The Al-Musta'sim Billah Mosque (Arabic: مسجد المستعصم بالله), formerly the Abu Rabi'ah Mosque, also known as Mashhad al-Wu'ud – before it became a mosque – is a Sunni mosque and shrine, located in the al-A'dhamiyya district of the city of Baghdad, in the Baghdad Governorate of Iraq. The structure was renovated in modern times, and it contains the tomb of the last Abbasid Caliph, al-Musta'sim.

== History ==
The site was the location of a shrine known as Mashhad al-Wu'ud, built over the grave of Ahmad al-Sabti, who was the son of the Abbasid Caliph Harun al-Rashid and a Sufi mystic. The Abbasid Caliph, al-Musta'sim was killed by Hulegu Khan's forces in the Siege of Baghdad in 1258, and his remains were reburied at this site. His daughter (Note: or granddaughter.) Rabi'ah was buried at the site later on, and a shrine was built for her, hence the name of the mosque was the Abu Rabi'ah Mosque.

Before discovering the Caliph's tomb, it was believed that al-Musta'sim was buried in the Mausoleum of Umar Suhrawardi. Following archaeological excavation at the mosque in 1993, Imad Abd al-Salam Ra'uf, an historian who was involved in the excavations, found the tombstone of the deceased Caliph. The mosque and the attached tomb were renovated in 2005. It was almost completely rebuilt in a modern Iraqi style. A room for the Imam and other necessities were added to the mosque's structure.

== Architecture ==
The area of the building is 1,000 square metres (11,000 sq ft) and the mosque can accommodate 200 worshippers. There is almost no trace of the original mosque, replaced by a modern structure. There is a small dome over the tomb of Caliph al-Musta'sim, and all other historical features of the tomb have disappeared.

== See also ==
- Sunni Islam in Iraq
- List of mosques in Baghdad
