= Nūram Mūbin =

1936 text by Ali Muhammad Jan Muhammad Chunara

Nūram Mubīn is a Gujarati Nizari Ismaili text written by Ali Muhammad Jan Muhammad Chunara (1881–1966) and first published in 1936. It tells of the lives of the Ismaili Imams from the seventh to the twentieth centuries, and is notable for being the first authorized Ismaili history written in an Indian vernacular language.

== Background ==
The Recreation Club Institute, a group established by Aga Khan III to promote the study of Ismaili history and literature, commissioned Chunara to write a Gujarati history of the Ismailis in 1919. Their choice of Gujarati reflected the dominant language of the Khoja community, and marked an important shift away from Arabic and Persian, the traditional languages of Ismaili scholarship. Chunara himself had been a secretary to Aga Khan III, but was probably best known as a journalist and editor of a biweekly journal, The Ismaili. Chunara, together with several colleagues from the journal, spent eight years researching relevant sources in several languages. Among the principal sources for Nūram Mubīn were the ginans, a multilingual body of literature that has played a central role in the devotional practices of the Ismaili Khoja community. The hagiographic quality of Nūram Mubīn likely owes much to its reliance on these texts, many of which attribute miracles and other phenomena to the Ismaili Imams. Although the text of Nūram Mubīn was in Gujarati, its Arabic title reflected wider efforts by Aga Khan III and others to emphasize the essentially Islamic nature of the Ismaili tradition. More specifically, its title connected the Ismaili notion of the “Light of the Imamate” with the Qur'anic line, “We have sent down to you a clear light [nūran mubīn]” (4:174), thus underscoring the Qur'anic basis for the Ismaili Imamate. Similarly, the text's subtitle, though in Gujarati, connected the Imamate to another Qur'anic concept, the “rope of God.” The completed text—which documented the lives of the Ismaili Imams until 1935—was presented in 1936, on the occasion of Aga Khan III's Golden Jubilee.

== Importance and legacy ==
In his own preface to the work, Chunara stated that he hoped that the text would better educate Ismailis about their faith and that it could aid them in responding to criticisms from other Muslim groups. He believed that by understanding the Qur'anic basis of Ismaili ideas and institutions, such as the ginans and the Ismaili Imamate, Ismailis would be able “to stand on both feet” and defend their tradition against anti-Ismaili polemic. Endorsed by the Aga Khan himself, the first edition of Nūram Mubīn was a huge success among the Ismaili community, leading to several re-printings. The popularity of the text gradually waned, however, and by the end of the twentieth century it was withdrawn from circulation entirely. Asani has suggested that the demise of the text derives from both changing sociopolitical contexts and its hagiographic nature. Reflecting the latter concern, subsequent authorized histories of the Ismaili Imams have adopted increasingly scholarly historical methods.

== Editions ==
Nūram Mubīn was translated into Urdu in 1940, and revised versions of the original Gujarati text appeared in 1950, 1951, and 1961.
