= Bab Bachir =

Umm walad of Abbasid Caliph al-Musta'sim

Bab Bachir باب بشير
- Died: 1254; Baghdad, Abbasid Caliphate
- Burial: Baghdad
- Spouse: Al-Musta'sim
- Children: Abu Nasr Muhammad ibn al-Musta'sim
Names
- Bab Bachir Umm Muhammad
- Occupation: Head and Founder of the Al Bashiriya School, East of the Sheikh Maarouf Cemetery in Baghdad.

Bab Bachir (Arabic: باب بشير) (died 1254) was a slave consort of the last Abbasid caliph, al-Musta'sim (r. 1242–1258) and mother of Abu Nasr Muhammad ibn al-Musta'sim.

She was a slave bought to the Harem by the Caliph and became his concubine.

When she gave birth to a son, prince Abu Nasr Muhammad, she became an umm walad and was manumitted by the Caliph, who married her.

After her marriage, she made herself known for her public charitable initiatives, which was a common method for the consorts of the Caliph (who could not leave the harem), to make themselves known.

She is known as the founder of the Al Bashiriya School, East of the Sheikh Maarouf Cemetery in Baghdad. The work on the school begun in 1251/1252, and a great public inauguration ceremony was held 1255/1256.

Bab Bachir Abbasid harem Born: 1220s Died: 27 December 1254
Preceded by Qurrat	Deputy head of Harem; 1240s – 1254	Succeeded by None (End of Abbasids)
