= Anjedan, Iran =

Village in Markazi province, Iran

Anjedan Persian: انجدان
- Village
- Location within Iran
- Coordinates: 33°58′39″N 50°01′54″E
- Country: Iran
- Province: Markazi
- County: Arak
- District: Central
- Rural District: Amanabad

Population (2016)
  - Total: 296
- Time zone: UTC+3:30 (IRST)

Anjedan (Persian: انجدان) (Note: Also romanized as Anjedān; also known as Andījān, Anjidān, Anjudan, and Injadān) is a village in Amanabad Rural District of the Central District in Arak County, Markazi province, Iran. It is situated near the major Shi'i centers of Qom and Kashan in Iran, to which the Nizari Ismaili Imamate was transferred during the late 14th century. Owing to the village's name, Nizari history between the 14th and 15th centuries is dubbed the "Anjedan period".

In November 1726, the town was the site of an important confrontation between the Ottoman Empire and the Afghan Hotaki Dynasty following the collapse of the Safavids.

== History of the Ismailis in Anjedan ==
The earliest evidence of an Ismaili presence in Anjedan is in the late 14th century at the time of Tamerlane's attack on the community. Various Persian historians including Mirkhwand and Khwadamir record that Anjedan was prepared for attack, with a village fortress and intricate tunnels. These however did not prevent Tamerlane's troops from prevailing. Despite the forays of Tamerlane in the region, Mirkhwand has pointed out in the late 15th century, that the village of Anjedan remained Ismaili.

=== Factors leading up to the transference of the Imamate ===
While the precise rationale for establishing the Imamate in Anjedan is unclear, there are various factors that likely contributed to this decision. Earlier efforts by the Ismailis to reestablish at Alamut were unsuccessful and the failure to fully obscure their religious convictions with the practice of taqiyya created a dangerous environment for the community in the South Caspian region. Anjedan's distant location from the major centers of Sunni dominance, Tabriz and Herat also made it advantageous for the Imamate to be situated here.

=== Timur's Siege of Anjedan ===
In May 1393 Timur's army invaded the village of Anjedan. This crippled the Ismaili village only one year after his assault on the Ismailis in Mazandaran. The village was prepared for the attack. This is evidenced by it containing a fortress and a system of tunnels. Undeterred, Timur's soldiers flooded the tunnels by cutting into a channel overhead. Timur's reasons for attacking this village are not yet well understood. However, it has been suggested that his religious persuasions and view of himself as an executor of divine will may have contributed to his motivations. The Persian historian Khwandamir explains that an Ismaili presence was growing more politically powerful in Persian Iraq. A group of locals in the region was dissatisfied with this and, Khwandamir writes, these locals assembled and brought up their complaint with Timur, possibly provoking his attack on the Ismailis there.

=== The Imams at Anjedan ===
- Al-Mustansir Billah II (1463/4–1480). The first known Ismaili Imam to have taken up residence in Anjedan was Mustansir bi’llah 'Alishah, better known as Imam Mustansir bi'llah II and locally as Shah Qalandar. His mausoleum in Anjedan, known to the family of the Ismaili Imams, was first brought to the attention of Western scholarship by one of the pioneers of the study of the Ismailis, Wladimir Ivanow. Imam Mustansir bi’llah II was the first Nizari Ismaili Imam to settle and live in the village of Anjedan. This Imam (or his mausoleum) was also known as Shah Qalandar, which is a common Sufi epithet since the name "Qalandar" evokes the wandering spiritual guide who has no need for any spiritual guide himself. The Pandiyāt-i Jawānmardī, which was authored anonymously under an Imam Mustansir bi’llah who is reported to have died in 1480, likely contains the teachings of the Imam Mustansir Bi'llah II.
- Abd al-Salam Shah (1480–1493/4). The successor to Imam Mustansir bi’llah, Mahmud ibn Mustansir bi’llah, also known as Salaam Allah, is recorded to have once commented that "contentment was more important than conquest". It was for this reason that Mustansir bi’llah bestowed his son with the title 'Abd al-Salam, meaning "servant of peace". His works include: Five Discourses (Panj Sukhan), Decree of the Imam 'Abd al-Salaam (Farmān-i Shāh 'Abd al-Salām, and A Poem of Shah 'Abd al-Salam b. Shah Mustansir bi’llah Bandī az Shāh 'Abd al-Salām [b.] Shāh Mustanṣir bi’llah.
- Gharib Mirza (al-Mustansir Billah III) (1493/4–1498). Imam 'Abbas Shah acquired the epithet "Gharib Mirza" due to his exile (ghurba) on account of political opposition. His works include: From the Discourses of Shah Gharib Mirza (Min Kalām-i Shāh Gharīb Mīrzā) on the mystical import of the alphabet and a poetic composition on similar topics. The mausoleum of this Imam is known locally as "Shah Gharib" and is still located in Anjedan today.

Financial support was regularly sent by Aga Khan I and Aga Khan II to the Anjedan people, in the late 19th century. In addition the Imams conducted restoration projects of various monuments and buildings of sentimental significance in the region.

== Demographics ==
=== Population ===
At the time of the 2006 National Census, the village's population was 446 in 154 households. The following census in 2011 counted 280 people in 101 households. The 2016 census measured the population of the village as 296 people in 118 households.

== Notable people ==
- Among the major exponents of literature during the Anjedan revival was a poet known as Da'i Anjudani, likely a high-ranking member in the Ismaili hierarchy (hudūd), and brother Mawlana Malik Tayfur Anjedani.
- The fortress of Nurabad near Anjedan is said to owe its name to a younger brother of Imam Gharib Mirza, Nur al-din.

== See also ==
- Mahdi
- Isma'ili
- Sufism
- Nāīmee
- Nasīmee
- Hurufiyya
- Shi'a Islam
- Nuktawiyya
- Murād Mīrzā
- Nuqta-yi Ula (Báb)
- Mahmoud Pasikhani
- List of Ismaili imams
- List of extinct Shia sects

Media related to Anjedan at Wikimedia Commons
