= Gharib Mirza =

Imam

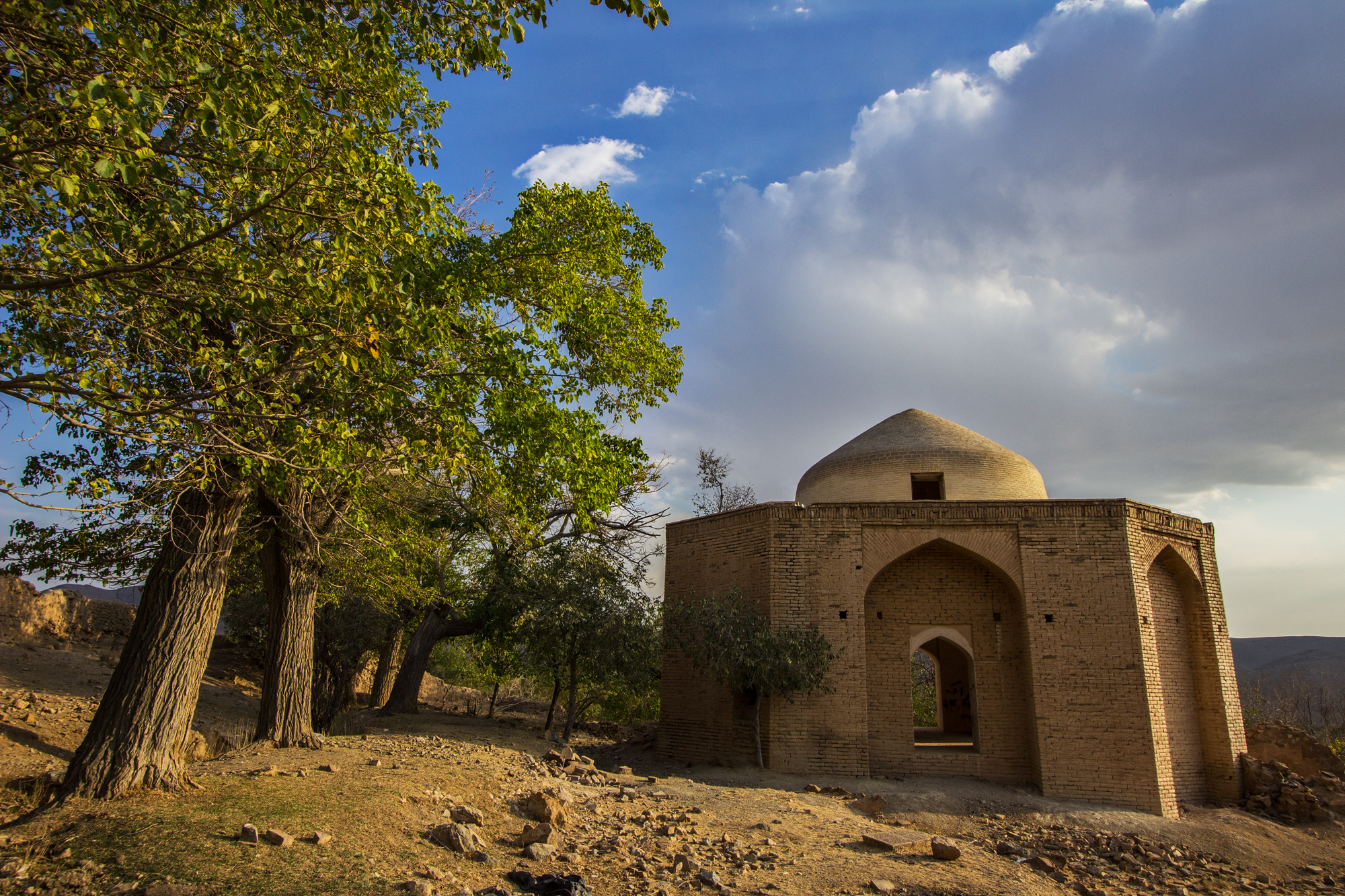
Mausoleum of al-Mustansir III, known locally as the tomb of Shah Gharib, Anjudan (Iran)

Abbas Shah (Persian: عباس شاه, romanized: ʿAbbās Shāh; died August 1498), also known as Gharib Mirza (Persian: غريب ميرزا, romanized: Gharīb Mīrzā) and with the regnal name of al-Mustansir Billah III (Arabic: المستنصر بالله الثالث, romanized: al-Mustanṣir Billāh al-Thalālith), was the 34th imam of the Qasim-Shahi branch of the Nizari Isma'ili community.

He succeeded his father Abd al-Salam Shah upon the latter's death in 1493–4, at Anjudan (Iran). According to oral Nizari tradition, Abbas Shah himself died in 1496–7, but the inscription in his mausoleum gives the date as August 1498. According to Nizari tradition, he was succeeded by his son Abu Dharr Ali, known as Nur al-Din.

== Sources ==
- Daftary, Farhad (2007). The Ismāʿı̄lı̄s: Their History and Doctrines (Second ed.). Cambridge: Cambridge University Press. ISBN 978-0-521-61636-2.
- Virani, Shafique N. The Ismailis in the Middle Ages. A History of Survival, A Search for Salvation. Oxford and New York: Oxford University Press. ISBN 978-0-19-531173-0.

Gharib Mirza of the Ahl al-Bayt Banu Hashim Clan of the Banu Quraish Born: ? C.E Died: 1498 C.E.
Regnal titles
Shia Islam titles
Preceded by Abd al-Salam Shah	34th Imam of Nizari Isma'ilism (Qasim-Shahi line); 1493/4–1498	Succeeded by Abu Dharr Ali
