= Al-Mustansir I =

36th and Penultimate Abbasid Caliph (r. 1226–1242)

Al-Mānsūr al-Mustansir bi-llah المنصور المستنصر بالله
- Khalīfah; Amir al-Mu'minin
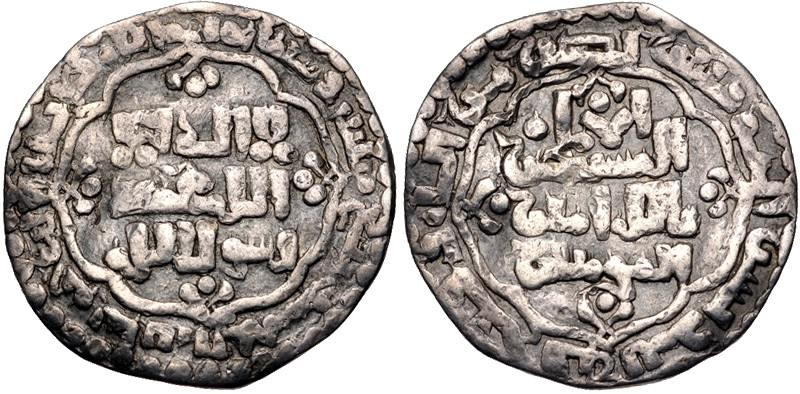
- Dirham of al-Mustansir

36th Caliph of the Abbasid dynasty Abbasid Caliph in Baghdad
- Reign: 10 July 1226 – 5 December 1242
- Predecessor: al-Zahir
- Successor: al-Musta'sim
- Born: 17 February 1192; Baghdad, Abbasid Caliphate, (now Iraq)
- Died: 5 December 1242 (aged 50); Baghdad, Abbasid Caliphate
- Burial: Baghdad
- Consort: Shahan; Hajir
- Issue: Al-Musta'sim
Names
- Abu Ja`far al-Mansūr al-Mustansir bi-llah ibn az-Zâhir
- Dynasty: Abbasid
- Father: al-Zāhīr
- Mother: Zahra
- Religion: Sunni Islam

Abu Ja'far al-Mansur ibn al-Zahir (Note: Arabic: أبو جعفر المنصوربن الظاهر, romanized: ʾAbū Jaʿfar al-Mānṣūr ibn al-Ẓāhir) (17 February 1192 – 2 December 1242), commonly known as al-Mustansir, (Note: Arabic: المستنصر بالله الأول, romanized: al-Mustanṣir bi-ʾAmr Allāh al-ʾAwwal) was the 36th Abbasid caliph, ruling from 1226 to 1242. He succeeded al-Zahir as caliph in the year 1226, and was the penultimate caliph to rule from Baghdad. He was the second-to-last caliph of the Abbasid Caliphate.

== Biography ==
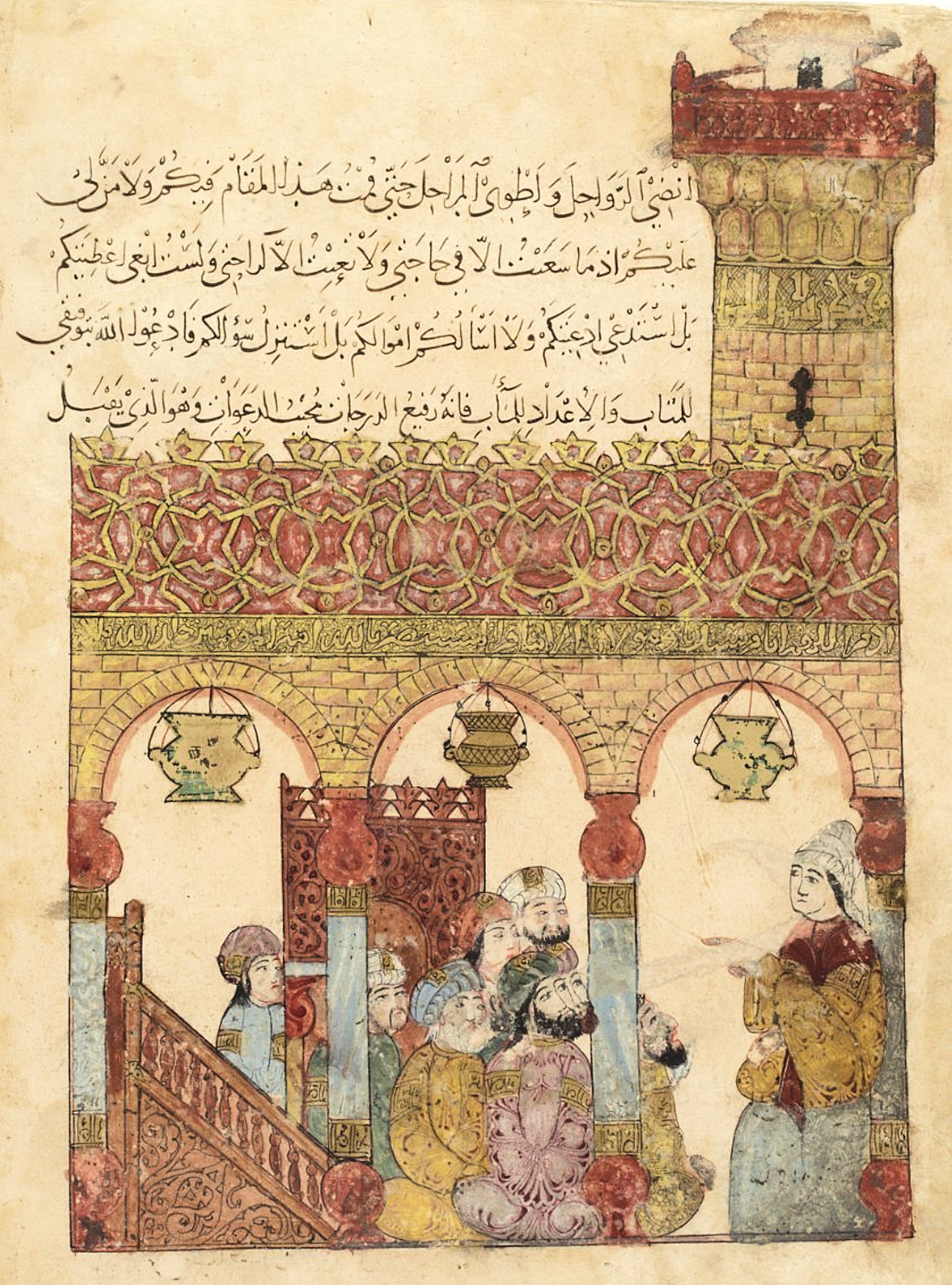
The name of Caliph al-Mustansir appears in this contemporary painting from folio 164v of the Maqamat al-Hariri, 1237 edition (BNF Arabe 5847).

Al-Mustansir was born in Baghdad on 1192. He was the son of Abu Nasr Muhammad (future caliph al-Zahir). His mother was a Turkish Umm walad. called Zahra. His full name was Mansur ibn Muhammad al-Zahir and his Kunya was Abu Jaʿfar. At the time of his birth, his father was a prince. When his father ascended to the throne in 1225. His father, lowered the taxes of Iraq, and built a strong army to resist invasions. He died on 10 July 1226, nine months after his accession.

On his father's death in 1226 he has succeeded his father Az-Zahir as the thirty-sixth Abbasid caliph in Baghdad. Al-Mustansir is particularly known for establishing the Mustansiriyya Madrasa (currently a part of the Al-Mustansiriya University) in 1227/32/34. The Madrasa, at the time, taught many subjects including medicine, mathematics, literature, grammar and Islamic religious studies, becoming a prominent and high-ranking center for Islamic studies in Baghdad.

The Madrasas during the Abbasid period were used as the predominant instrument to foster the spread of Islamic thought as well as a way to extend the founder's pious ideals.

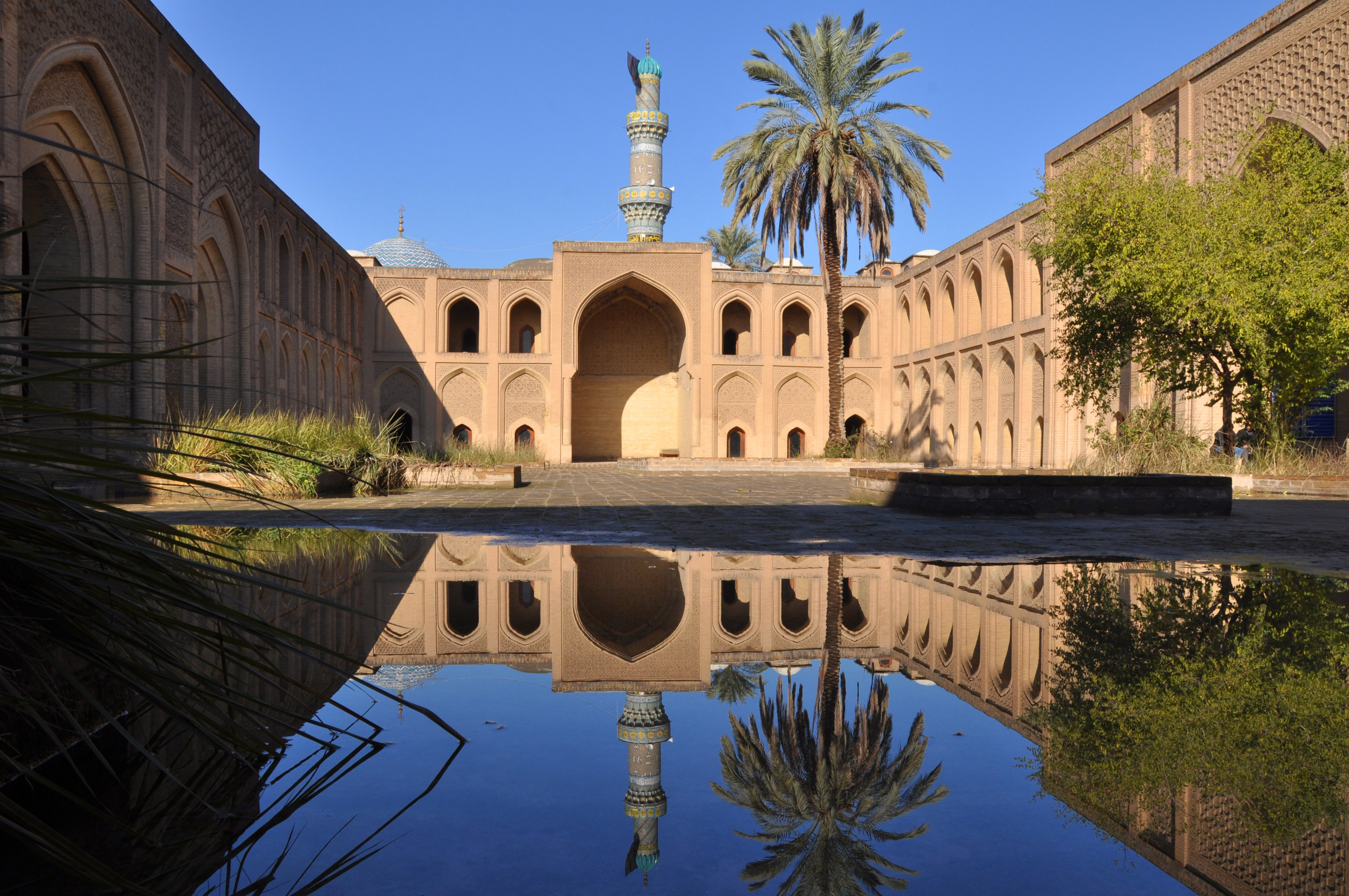
The Courtyard of the Mustansiriyya Madrasa

The ruler of Erbil, Muzaffar ad-Din Gökböri was being without a male heir, Gökböri willed Erbil to the Abbasid caliph al-Mustansir. After the death of Gökböri in 1233, the Erbil city came under Abbasid control.

Al-Mustansir died on 5 December 1242. His son Al-Musta'sim succeeded him as the thirty-seventh and last Caliph of the Abbasid Caliphate.

== Family ==
One of Al-Mustansir's concubines was Shahan. She was a Greek, and had been formerly a slave of Khata Khatun, the daughter of the commander Sunqur al-Nasiri the Tall and the wife of the commander Jamal al-Din Baklak al-Nasiri. After Al-Mustansir's accession to the throne, Khata presented Shahan to him as a gift, as part of a group of slaves. Shahan alone among them became his concubine and favourite. Another of his concubines was Hajir. She was the mother of the future Caliph Al-Musta'sim.

== See also ==
- Sixth Crusade (1228–1229), a military expedition to recapture the city of Jerusalem from Muslims.

== Sources ==
- This text is adapted from William Muir's public domain, The Caliphate, Its Rise, Decline, and Fall: From Original Sources. ((Edinburgh: John Grant Publishing, 1915)
- Hasan, M. (1998). History of Islam: Classical period, 571-1258 C.E. History of Islam. Islamic Publications. p. 304
- Al-Maqrizi, Al Selouk Leme'refatt Dewall al-Melouk, Dar al-kotob, 1997.
- Morray D.W. (1994) An Ayyubid Notable and His World: Ibn Al-ʻAdīm and Aleppo as Portrayed in His Biographical Dictionary of People Associated with the City, Brill. Leiden. ISBN 9004099565
- Al-Sāʿī, Ibn; Toorawa, Shawkat M.; Bray, Julia (2017). كتاب جهات الأئمة الخلفاء من الحرائر والإماء المسمى نساء الخلفاء: Women and the Court of Baghdad. Library of Arabic Literature.

Al-Mustansir I Abbasid dynasty Cadet branch of the Banu Hashim Born: 17 February 1192 Died: 5 December 1242
Sunni Islam titles
Preceded by Az-Zahir	Caliph of Islam; Abbasid Caliph; 10 July 1226 – 5 December 1242	Succeeded by Al-Musta'sim
