= Shia Islam in Africa =

Religion in Africa

Shia Islam in Africa is the continent's second most widely professed sect of Islam behind Sunni Islam.

== By country ==
=== Nigeria ===
The "African Shia Islamic Movement" is a Nigeria-based organization. Sheikh Ibraheem Zakzaky is the leader of the movement. It was founded in the 1980s, after Zakzaky traveled to Iran and was inspired by the 1979 Iranian Revolution. In 2014, a procession of Shias celebrating Quds Day attempted to pass a military checkpoint. A standoff ensued, with the Nigerian soldiers firing warning shots at the protesting Shias, who reportedly responded by throwing rocks at the soldiers, who then opened fire, reportedly killing 35 Shias, among them three of Zakzaky's children. In 2015, IMN protestors blocked a public road which a convoy containing Nigerian general Tukur Buratai was attempting to pass. The incident was described by the Nigerian military as an assassination attempt, a charge which the IMN denies. In retaliation, the Nigerian military launched a series of raids in the ancient town of Zaria, claiming it was in an effort to preempt attacks from the IMN. These raids resulted in the deaths of reportedly as many as 300 Nigerian Shias. Zakzaky himself was wounded and captured, along with one of his wives, and charges of murder were brought against him over the road blocking incident earlier that year. In 2019, protests broke out once more as a delegation belonging to the IMN stormed the National Assembly in Abuja to protest the continued incarceration of Zakzaky. The resulting melee killed at least two, though details of the incident are unclear. These protests moved the Nigerian government to officially ban the IMN on July 28, 2019, citing "acts of terrorism and illegality." Exactly two years later, Zakzaky would be released, after a court cleared him of all charges.

=== Senegal ===
Shia Islam in Senegal is practiced by both native Senegalese people, and the Lebanese community in Senegal. One of their primary leaders was Sheikh Abdul-Mun'am Az-zain, who primarily served the Lebanese community but was also open to spread it to the Senegalese. The Sheikh built Shi'a schools and mosques and also provided scholarships to Senegalese students. 1% of Senegalese people practice Shi'a Islam. Major Shia organizations in Senegal include the Mozdahir International Institute, headed by Senegalese Shi'i religious leader Cherif Mohamed Aly Aidara.

=== Egypt ===
Historically, Egypt was ruled for two centuries by the Ismaili Shia Fatimid Caliphate. Egypt came under Sunni control with the rise of Saladin and the Ayyubid Sultanate in the 12th century. This history has created a complicated situation in Egypt with regards to the Sunni-Shia divide, with a common saying being "Egypt is Sunni by Sect, Shia in temperament." Today, Shias face persecution in modern Egypt, though the situation for them may be slowly improving. While President Abdel Fattah el-Sisi and Egypt's powerful Salafist movement have both characterized Shias as having deviated from proper Islamic tradition, and accused the sect of working with Iran to spread a renewed, Shia Persian Empire, actual treatment of Shias by the Egyptian government has been less harsh since the ousting of Mohammed Morsi in 2013. Hosni Mubarak's administration also imprisoned more than 300 Shias in 2009 without justification.

==== Growing Shia Community in Egypt ====
An accurate estimation of the current number of Shia Muslims in Egypt is difficult to attain, ranging from as few as 50,000 to as many as 2 million adherents. Shaykh Hasan Shehata, a religious scholar from Al-Azhar University, also controversially converted to Shia Islam in the 1990s and established a small community of converts in Zawya Abu Musalem in Giza, tensions reached a breaking point when a Salafi mob, motivated by anti-Shia rhetoric and President Morsi, lynched Shehata and four of his Shia followers in 2013. Most Egyptian Shias are Usulis, despite being overwhelmingly Ghair muqallideen, with a large minority following Sadiq Shirazi.

=== Tanzania ===
According to two studies by the Pew Research Center, around 20% of Muslims in Tanzania are Shia.

== African diaspora ==
=== African Americans ===
During the Muslim movement in the United States during the 20th century, the African American community was also introduced to Shia Islam. The majority of African American in that time were not aware of the Sunni-Shia divide, although most became Sunni due to how it was more widespread, a lack of access to Shia learning materials, as well as the stigma associated with Shia Islam. The 1979 Iranian Revolution gave Shia Muslims a voice within the Muslim community. This was the time when African Americans were first exposed to Shia Islam, and by 1982, more than one thousand African Americans had accepted Shia Islam in Philadelphia alone. Many Salafi and Wahhabi preachers were unhappy about the growth of Shia Islam, and began telling African American Muslims that it was disbelief, which alienated African American Shias from their community. African American Sunnis, encouraged by Sunni extremist missionaries, often attacked African American Shias in prisons.

A popular African American Shia preacher is Amir Hakeem, who joined the Nation of Islam in prison and later converted to Shia Islam before being released. Hakeem became an assistant at a mosque in Watts and hosts charity work as well as teaching gang members in Los Angeles about Shia Islam. He stated that the Shia community of Watts is predominantly African Americans.

Malcolm Shabazz, the grandson of Malcolm X, also converted to Shia Islam and had died as a Shia Muslim.

=== Jamaica ===
Jamaica has a Muslim population of around 1,500. Hosay is a Shia Muslim tradition which was brought to Jamaica and the Caribbean by the South Asian community.

== Nizari Ism'ailism ==
In East Africa, there is a large community of Ismaili Shias, mostly being Indian diaspora in Africa, most of which being a result of a deliberate effort by Aga Khan III, the 47th imam of the Nizari Ismaili sect of Islam. However, Shias have lived in East Africa as early as the sixteenth century, with one story claiming the first Shia to migrate to the region having done so while assisting Vasco da Gama.

You want to know the first member of our family to be in Africa and when? Well, his name was Mohamed, and he was known as ‘Kana Maalim’. That name means “Master of the Tiller", because in the language of Gujarbhadalat, which is where we Badalas are from, the word for tiller, or rudder, is ‘sukhan’. He was the who showed Vasco De Gama the way from Malindi to India

Shias began migrating in greater numbers to East Africa with the establishment of the Omani Sultanate in 1840, becoming merchants and readers along the coast. A few decades later, the immigration of Ismaili Shias from India to East Africa greatly increased, as the Aga Khan's efforts to encourage migration began. British official Sir Bartle Frere estimated that more than 700 Ismaili families lived in Zanzibar in 1876, an increase of about three hundred in the past 16 years, a wave of immigration which can be traced directly to "the advice of the imam (Aga Khan III)." The Ismaili community in western India had been stricken with poverty and famine, and the edicts of the imam encouraging migration were done in an attempt for his followers to find greater economic opportunity while remaining under British protection. The current Aga Khan remains active in the region, and has founded a development network dedicated to improving the economic conditions of Ismaili communities around the world, including the East African countries of Kenya, Tanzania, Uganda, Rwanda, and Mozambique, where most of the migrants who left India in the late 19th and early 20th centuries moved to.

In 1972, Ugandan President Idi Amin ordered the expulsion of all persons of Asian descent from Uganda, which included the Nizari Ismailis. The Aga Khan IV called then-Canadian Prime Minister Pierre Trudeau, whose government accepted thousands of Nizaris into Canada.

== See also ==
- Qibla (group), a Shi'a militant organization in South Africa
- Cherif Mohamed Aly Aidara, a Shi'a Senegalese religious leader
