= Shafique Virani =

Islamic Studies professor

Shafique N. Virani is Distinguished Professor of Islamic Studies at the Institute of Islamic Studies, University of Toronto. Having earned a master's degree in Islamic Studies from McGill University and a PhD from Harvard University, he has also served as faculty at Harvard University and Zayed University.

He has won several international awards, such as the 2001 Dissertation Award from the Foundation for Iranian Studies, the 2008 British-Kuwait Friendship Society Book Prize (for his The Ismailis in the Middle Ages), and the Farabi International Award (granted annually by the Iranian Ministry of Science).

In 2014, the American Academy of Religion named Virani the recipient of its Excellence in Teaching Award.

== Publications ==
- Virani, Shafique N. (2007). The Ismailis in the Middle Ages: A History of Survival, a Search for Salvation. New York: Oxford University Press. doi:10.1093/acprof:oso/9780195311730.001.0001. ISBN 9780195311730.
