= Nizari Isma'ilism =

Shia sect of Islam

The Nizari Isma'ili flag (1986)

Nizari Isma'ilis (Arabic: النزارية, romanized: al-Nizāriyya) are the largest segment of the Ismailis, who are the second largest branch of Shia Islam after the Twelvers. Nizari teachings emphasise pluralism, social justice and ijtihad (a term referring to the practise of independent reasoning by experts in Islamic law) – though they reject usul (the traditional methodological principles used in Islamic jurisprudence). Nizaris, along with Twelvers, adhere to the Jaʽfari school of jurisprudence. The Aga Khan, currently Aga Khan V, is the spiritual leader and Imam of most modern Nizaris. The global seat of the Ismaili Imamate is in Lisbon, Portugal.

== Early history ==
Nizari Isma'ili history is often traced through the unbroken hereditary chain of guardianship, or walayah, beginning with Ali ibn Abi Talib, whom Shias believe the prophet Muhammad declared his successor as Imam during the latter's final pilgrimage to Mecca, and continued in an unbroken chain to the most recent Imam, Shah Rahim al-Hussaini, the Aga Khan.

=== Fatimid usurpation, schism, and the flight of the Nizari ===
The rival lines of succession of the Isma'ili imams resulting from the Musta'li–Nizari and Hafizi–Tayyibi schisms

From early in his reign, the Fatimid Caliph-Imam al-Mustansir Billah had publicly named his elder son Nizar as his heir to be the next Fatimid Caliph-Imam. Dai Hassan-i Sabbah, who had studied and accepted Ismailism in Fatimid Egypt, had been made aware of this fact personally by al-Mustansir. After Al-Mustansir died in 1094, al-Afdal Shahanshah, the all-powerful Armenian vizier and commander of the armies, wanted to assert, like his father before him, dictatorial rule over the Fatimid State. Al-Afdal engineered a palace coup, placing his brother-in-law, the much younger and dependent al-Musta'li, on the Fatimid throne. Al-Afdal claimed that al-Mustansir had made a deathbed decree in favour of Musta'li and thus got the Ismaili leaders of the Fatimid Court and Fatimid Dawa in Cairo, the capital city of the Fatimids, to endorse Musta'li, which they did, realizing that the army was behind the palace coup.

In early 1095, Nizar fled to Alexandria, where he received the people's support and where he was accepted as the next Fatimid Caliph-Imam after al-Mustansir, with gold dinars being minted in Alexandria in Nizar's name (one such coin, found in 1994, is in the collection of the Aga Khan Museum). In late 1095, al-Afdal defeated Nizar's Alexandrian army and took Nizar prisoner to Cairo where he had Nizar executed.

After Nizar's execution, the Nizari Ismailis and the Musta'li Ismailis parted ways in a bitterly irreconcilable manner. The schism finally broke the remnants of the Fatimid Empire, and the now-divided Ismailis separated into the Musta'li following (inhabiting regions of Egypt, Yemen, and western India) and those pledging allegiance to Nizar's son al-Hadi ibn Nizar (living in regions of Iran and Syria). The latter Ismaili following came to be known as Nizari Ismailism.

=== Origin of the Fidai ===
==== Assassins ====
The Fidai were feared as the Assassins, but did not kill for payment. Although they were trained in the art of spying and combat, they also practiced Islamic mysticism at the highest level. This religious ardor turned them into formidable foes, as in the anecdote of Count Henry of Champagne. Returning from Armenia, Henry spoke with Grand Master Rashid ad-Din Sinan (known to the West as "The Old Man of the Mountain") at one of his castles, al-Kahf, in Syria. Henry pointed out that since his army was bigger by far than Sinan's, Sinan should pay him an annual tribute.

Sinan refused, asserting that his army was far stronger, in spirit and unquestioning obedience if not in numbers. He invited Henry to witness this obedience and sacrificial spirit of his Fidai. Sinan signalled to a Fidai standing on the parapet of a high wall of his castle, to jump. The Fidai called out "God is Great" and unhesitatingly took a headlong death dive into the rocks far below. The bewildered Henry asked Sinan the cause for the suicidal jump. Sinan pointed once again to the Fidai who had taken the place of the now dead Fidai. Again Sinan gave a signal to the Fidai to jump and the second Fidai also called out "God is Great" and jumped to his death. Henry was visibly shaken by the experience of witnessing the two Fidais' total disregard for their own lives. He accepted Sinan's terms of peace on a non-tribute-paying basis. The Nizaris thus averted debilitating wars against them because of their Fidais' feats of self-sacrifice and assassinations of powerful enemy leaders to demonstrate the will and commitment of the community to live free from being a vassal to any Levantine power.

It is unknown how the "Old Man of the Mountain" was able to get the Assassins to perform with such fervent loyalty. One theory, possibly the best known but also the most criticized, comes from the reports of Marco Polo during his travels to the Orient. He recounts a story he heard that Muhammad III of Alamut would drug his young followers with hashish, lead them to a "paradise", and then claim that only he had the means to allow for their return. Perceiving that Muhammad III was either a prophet or magician, his disciples, believing that only he could return them to "paradise", were fully committed to his cause and willing to carry out his every request. In the 19th century, Marco Polo's account was accepted by Austrian orientalist Joseph von Hammer-Purgstall and until the 1930s served as the standard description of the Nizari Ismailis across Europe. "The Russian orientalist Vladimir Alexeyevich Ivanov ... gained access also to Nizari literature preserved in Central Asia, Persia, Afghanistan and elsewhere ... compiled the first detailed catalogue of (Nizari and Fatimid) Ismaili works, citing some 700 separate titles attesting to the hitherto unknown richness and diversity of (Nizari and Fatimid) Ismaili literature and literary traditions".

The Fidai were some of the most feared assassins in the then known world. Sinan ordered assassinations against politicians and generals such as the great Kurdish general and founder of the Ayyubid dynasty, Saladin. A sleeping Saladin had a note from Sinan delivered to him by a Fidai planted in his entourage. The note was pinned to his pillow with a dagger, and it informed Saladin that he had been spared this once and should give up his anti-Nizari militancy. A shaken Saladin quickly made a truce with Sinan.

Subsequently, the Fidai aided the Muslim cause against the Christian Crusaders of the Third Crusade which included Richard the Lionheart of England. Saladin, having by now established a friendly relationship with Sinan, the Nizari Fidai themselves joined Saladin's forces to defeat the Crusaders in the last great battle between the two forces. Later on, when "the Nizaris faced renewed Frankish hostilities, they received timely assistance from the Ayyubids".

=== Further schisms ===
The Nizari Ismailis have since split from others, initially from the Qarmatians, Druze, Musta'li Ismailis, Muhammad Shahi Nizari Ismailis, and Satpanthis, the last two splitting from the Nizari branch of Ismailism in the 14th and 15th centuries. Following the death of 28th Imam Shams al-Din Muhammad, the Nizari Isma'ili split was into two groups: the Mu'mini Nizari (Muhammad-Shahi Nizari) who considered his elder son Ala al-Din Mu'min Shah to be the next Imam followed by his son Muhammad Shah, and the Qasimi Nizari (Qasim-Shahi Nizari) who consider his younger son Qasim Shah to be the next Imam. The final known 40th Imam of the Mu'mini Nizari, Amir Muhammad al-Baqir ibn Haydar al-Mutahhar disappeared in 1796. The Mu'mini line has diminished today to a few thousand followers in Syria, while the Qasim-Shahi line has ended up representing most modern Isma'ilis, and is led today by the Aga Khans.

The Nizaris regard Hassan bin Ali as a Trustee Imam (imam al-mustawda) as opposed to a Hereditary Imam (imam al-mustaqarr). This fact is clearly demonstrated in the recitation of the Nizari Ismailis’ daily prayers, in which although Hassan bin Ali is revered as part of the Prophet's personal family (Ahl al-Bayt), his name is not included in the hereditary lineage from their first Imam, Imam Ali, to their 50th and present Imam, Aga Khan V. If Hassan bin Ali's name were to be included as one of the Ismaili Imams in their prayer recitation, then the present Imam would have to be the 51st Imam and not the 50th Imam - the way he has identified himself and is known to the world.

== Contemporary history ==
The majority of modern Nizārī Ismā'īlīs, following the Qasim-Shahi line of succession, accept the Aga Khan as their Imām-i-Zaman (Imam of the Time). Aga Khan IV (Karim al-Hussaini), who was Imām until his death in 2025, was referred to in Persian as Khudawand (Lord of the Time), in Arabic as Maulana (Master) or Hāzar Imām (Present Imam). Karim succeeded his grandfather Aga Khan III (Sir Sultan Muhammad Shah) as Imām in 1957, when he was a twenty-year-old undergraduate at Harvard University. He was referred to as "the Imam of the Atomic Age". The period following his accession can be characterized as one of rapid political and economic change. Planning of programs and institutions became increasingly difficult due to the rapid changes in the newly emerging post-colonial nations where many of his followers resided. Upon becoming Imām, Karim's immediate concern was the preparation of his followers, wherever they lived, for the changes that lay ahead. This rapidly evolving situation called for bold initiatives and new programs to reflect developing national aspirations in the newly independent nations. The current Imām as of 4 February 2025 is Karim's son, Aga Khan V (Rahim al-Hussaini).

In view of the importance that Islām places on maintaining a balance between the spiritual well-being of the individual and the quality of his life, the Imām's guidance deals with both aspects of the life of his followers. The Aga Khan IV encouraged Isma'ili Muslims settled in the industrialized world to contribute towards the progress of communities in the developing world through various development programs. The Economist noted that Isma'ili immigrant communities integrated seamlessly as immigrant communities and did better at attaining graduate and post-graduate degrees, "far surpassing their native, Hindu, Sikh, fellow Muslims, and Chinese communities".

One aspect of the Ismaili community's economic prosperity lies an ethos of mutual support and help existing within the community and devotion to the Imam This can result in commercial cooperation and marriages within the community. The present Imam regularly bestows worldly and spiritual guidance to the community.

=== Seat of the Ismaili Imamate ===
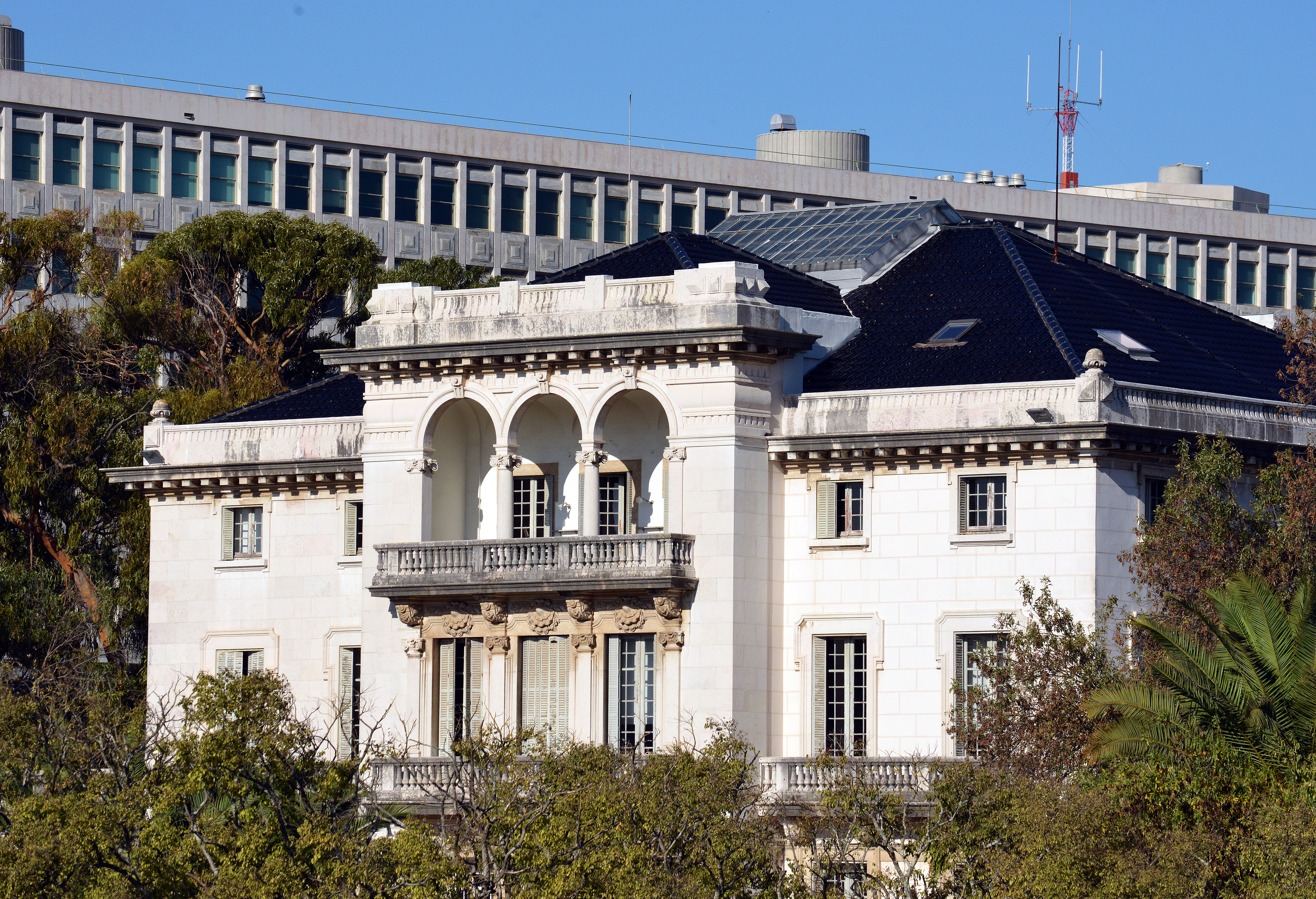
Palacete Mendonça in Lisbon

Following an agreement with the government of Portugal in 2015, the Aga Khan IV officially designated the Henrique de Mendonça Palace, located on Rua Marquês de Fronteira in Lisbon, as the "Diwan (seat) of the Ismaili Imamat" (Portuguese: Divã do Imamato Ismaeli) on 11 July 2018.

== Theology ==
=== God ===
Nizari Ismaili theology is the pre-eminent negative or apophatic theology of Islam because it affirms the absolute Oneness of God (tawhid) through negating all names, descriptions, conceptions, and limitations from God. The Ismaili theology of tawhid goes back to the teachings of the early Shi‘a Imams, especially Imam Ali ibn Abi Talib (d. 661), Imam Muhammad al-Baqir (d. 743), and Imam Ja‘far al-Sadiq (d. 765). Additionally, a number of eminent Ismaili Muslim philosophers – Abu Ya‘qub al-Sjistani (d. 971), Ja‘far ibn Mansur al-Yaman (d. 960), Hamid al-Din al-Kirmani (d. 1021), al-Mu’ayyad al-Din Shirazi (d. 1077), Nasir-i Khusraw (d. 1088) -consolidated and refined the Ismaili theology of tawhid using the strongest philosophical arguments of their time. Even in the present age, Imam Shah Karim al-Husayni Aga Khan IV, the 49th hereditary Imam of the Shi‘a Ismaili Muslims, continued to stress the absolute and utter transcendence of God. At the 1975 All-Ismailia Paris Conference, the Ismaili Imam endorsed and approved the following resolution concerning the contemporary Ismaili position on the concept of God:

The absolute transcendence of God to be emphasized, and the Ismaili belief in God to be expounded in association with the general stress on the transcendence of God in the Qur’an, as exemplified particularly in the Surat al-Ikhlas.

The Ismaili Concept of tawhid can be summarized as follows:

- God is beyond all names and attributes (including every name and attribute mentioned in the Qur’an, such as the Powerful, the Living, the First, the Last, etc.);
- God is beyond matter, energy, space, time and change;
- God is beyond all human conceptions of the imagination and intellect;
- God is beyond both positive and negative qualities – He is not knowing and not not knowing and He is not powerful and not not powerful;
- God is beyond all philosophical and metaphysical categories – spiritual/material, cause/effect, eternal/temporal, substance/accident, essence/attributes, and existence/essence – God is above existence and non-existence;
- When God is associated with a name or attribute in scripture, ritual or everyday speech, e.g. "God is knowing", the real meaning of this statement is that God is the source and originator of that power or quality, i.e. God is the originator of all knowledge but He Himself is beyond actually possessing knowledge as an attribute;
- God's Creative Act is called His Word or Command – this Command is a single, eternal, and continuous act which continually gives existence to and sustains all created or conditioned realities in every moment of their existence.

The full recognition of tawhid, in a mode beyond human rational discourse, is a spiritual and mystical realization in the human soul and intellect called ma'rifah. In the Ismaili tariqah of Islam, the ma‘rifah of the tawhid of God is attained through the Imam of the Time. The perfect soul of the Imam of the Time always experiences the fullness of the ma‘rifah of God and his murids reach that recognition through the recognition of the Imam.

=== Quran ===
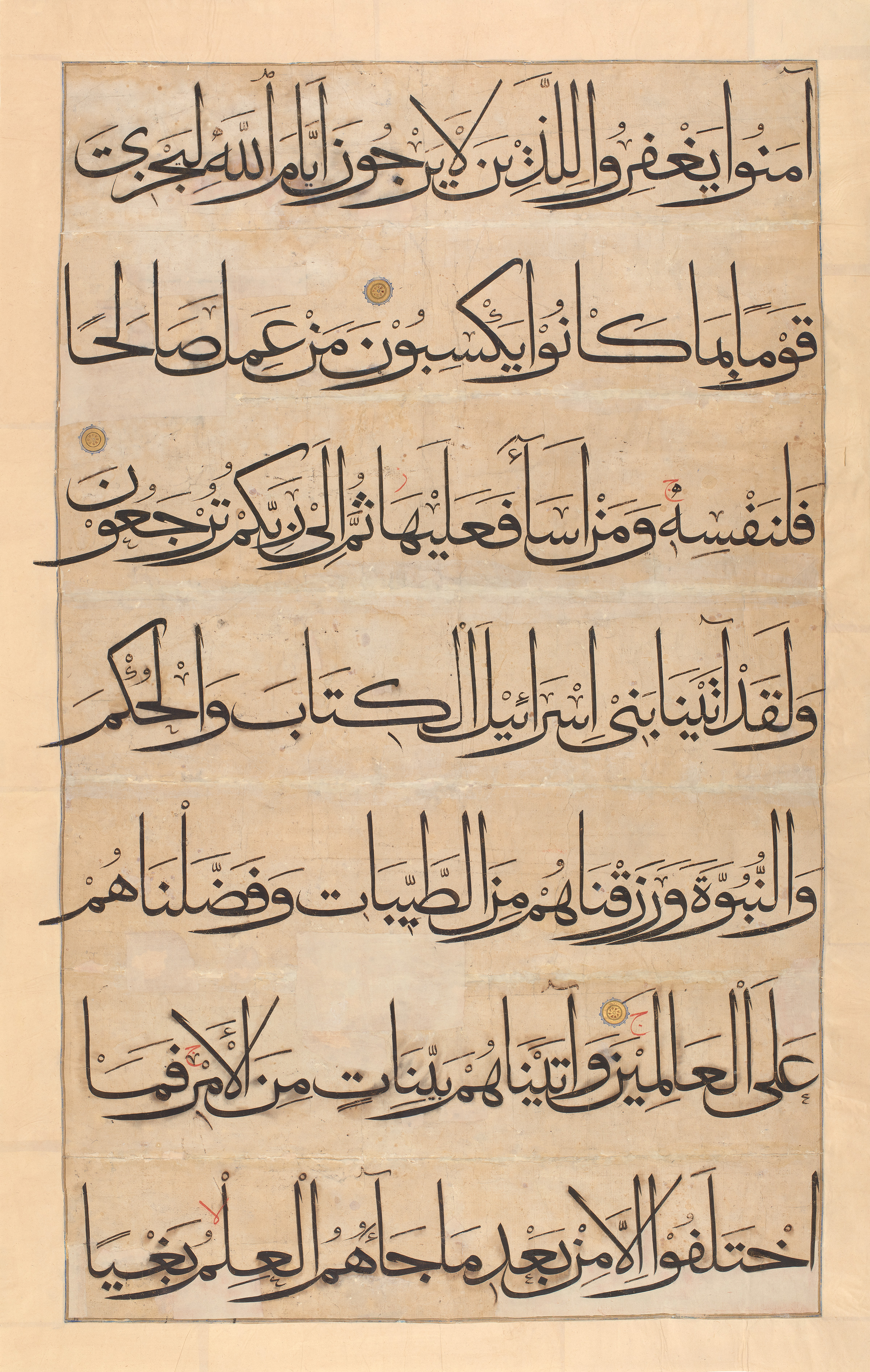
A water colour ink and gold page from a Persian Quran, 14th century

Nizaris, like all Muslims, consider the Quran, the central religious text of Islam, to be the word of God. Nizaris employ tafsir (the science of Quranic commentary) for zahir, or exoteric understanding, and taʾwīl (the Quranic poetic metre), for batin, or esoteric understanding.

=== Rationalism ===
For Nizaris, there exists a dialectic between revelation and human reasoning, based on a synergy of Islamic scripture and classical Greek philosophy, in particular Aristotelian reasoning and neoplatonic metaphysics. It seeks to extend an understanding of religion and revelation to identify the outwardly apparent (zahir), and also to penetrate to the roots, to retrieve and disclose that which is the inner underlying (batin). This process of discovery engages both the intellect ('aql) and the spirit (ruh), generating an integral synergy to illuminate and disclose truths (haqi'qat) culminating in gnosis (ma'rifat). Parallels have also been noted between the Nizari version of Imamah and the Platonic idea of a philosopher king.

=== Eschatology ===
Over the many phases of Nizārī Ismāʿīlī history – pre-Fāṭimid, Fāṭimid, Alamūt, Post-Alamūt, Anjudan, etc., there has never been a single unified view of eschatology. While there are certainly eschatological ideas from the Pre-Fāṭimid period that have been carried unto the present day, particularly those of Abū Ya’qūb al-Sijistānī and his intellectual disciples, each phase has brought in original ideas and renewed those of the past. The academic field of Ismāʿīlī eschatology is one that has been rarely studied in western secondary literature, and the little work that has been done on Ismāʿīlī eschatology primarily surrounds the event of the proclamation of a qiyāmah during the Alamūt period. Otherwise, no study has been published on the eschatologies of pre-Fāṭimid Ismāʿīlī thinkers and post-Alamūt Ismaili thinkers. Furthermore, no work done has been done on the eschatology of the South Asian traditions of Nizārī Ismāʿīlism. The Ismāʿīlīs, like the falāsifa (Islamic Neoplatonic-Aristotelian philosophers), have understood resurrection, paradise, and hell through taʾwīl (esoteric interpretation) and, thus, have all argued that these are spiritual realities and not physical, material realities. On the rewards of Paradise, al-Sijistānī writes in the Kitāb al-Yanābīʿ:

لما كان قصارى الثواب انما هي اللذة ، وكانت اللذة الحسية منقطعة زائلة ، وجب ان تكون التي ينالها المثاب ازلية غير فانية ، باقية غير منقطعة . وليست لذة بسيطة باقية على حالاتها غير لذة العلم . كان من هذا القول وجوب لذه العلم للمثاب في دار البقاء ، كما قال الله عز وجل : اكلها دائم وظلها تلك عقبى الذين اتقوا

Because the limit of reward is pleasure, and sensual pleasure is ephemeral, and it is necessary that the reward which is obtained be eternal and not ephemeral, everlasting and not discontinuous. And there is no simple, everlasting pleasure except the pleasure of knowledge. From this statement, it necessarily follows that the pleasure of knowledge is the reward in the hereafter, as God, glorified and sublime, said: Its fruit is everlasting and its shade, that is the destination of those who are righteous (Qurʾān 13:35)"

According to al-Sijistānī, the most important piece of knowledge to acquire is the recognition of the one who initiates the resurrection, whom he calls Ṣāḥib al-Qiyāmah (Lord of Resurrection). Al-Sijistānī writes in the Kitāb al-Yanābīʿ:

فترى الناس على طبقتين : طبقة ممن آمنوا به وصدقوه وانتظروا ظهور، فهم بذلك النور مقتبسون، متنعمون ، مستبشرون . وطبقة ممن كذبوا به وغفلوا عن حده ۲ ، فهم بذلك النور ايضاً متحرقون ، معاقبون

So you will see people divided into two classes: One class consists of those who believe in the Lord of Resurrection, pronounce his Truth, and await his appearance. They are in that Light, acquiring knowledge, blessed, and rejoicing. The other class consists of those who deny him and ignore his rank. They are in the Light also, but are burned and punished

Paradise and Hellfire in the Nizārī Ismāʿīlī tradition, are thus, not characterised by material forms, sensual pleasures, and physical burning, rather Paradise is understood to be the presence of knowledge of real truths while Hellfire is understood to be ignorance. The Nizārī Ismāʿīlī philosopher-theologians, as can be seen in the passage quoted above, did not believe that Paradise and Hellfire were "places" that souls inhabit, rather – because the rewards and punishments are spiritual – they are something the soul directly experiences in itself. Al-Sijistānī explicitly says in the passage above that both classes of people are exposed to same the Light (فهم بذلك النور ايضاً), however one class experiences this Light as blessings whilst the other experiences it as burning. These states correspond not to location, but to the level of knowledge in the soul. Additionally, the most famous intellectual disciple of al- Sijistānī – Nāṣir-i Khusraw – writes in the Shish Fasl:

[I]t is inevitable that the human soul should return to the Universal Soul. The question only concerns the manner in which it will return...If, however, the return of the individual soul to its source is not in harmony, it will meet with suffering hardships whose painfulness is described by being placed in the midst of fire, the position which will never come to an end

Thus, for Nāṣir-i Khusraw, all souls return to the same spiritual abode but those souls which are ignorant will experience pain, as if "being placed in the midst of fire". While Nāṣir-i Khusraw suggests here the suffering is eternal, he has in another text – specifically the Wajh-i Dīn – indicated that the pains of Hell are temporary and that the Prophet will come on the Day of Resurrection to blow out the fires of Hell and rescue its inhabitants. While both infernalist and universalist positions have existed as legitimate views in the community, annihilationist views have existed as well, specifically being introduced by Naṣīr al-Dīn al-Ṭūsī. Like both al-Sijistānī and Nāṣir-i Khusraw, Naṣīr al-Dīn al-Ṭūsī believed that paradise and hell were spiritual and mental states that the soul experiences and not physical places or sensual pains and desires. While Naṣīr al-Dīn al-Ṭūsī believed that the punishment of ignorant, damned souls was eternal, he believed this eternal punishment took the form of annihilation, i.e. permanent non-existence. He writes:

There is also only one real Hell, and that is eternal punishment, everlasting disappointment and eternal non-existence; the meaning of all this is being outcast from God in every sense of the word

The last most public eschatological view espoused by any Ismāʿīlī was written by the 48th Ismāʿīlī Imām – Sulṭān Muḥammad Shāh Āgā Khān III – who endorses a universalist position in regards to salvation and specifically states in his Memoirs that he prays "that all may be reconciled in Heaven in a final total absolution". The position of Āgā Khān III can be said to be generally in line with classical Ismāʿīlī views, as well as the views of the falāsifa and Sunnī-Sufīs like Ibn ʿArabi (such as in his Futūḥāt al-Makkiyya) and those of the Shīʿī ʿIrfān tradition, like Mullā Ṣadra (such as in his Tafsīr Sūrat al-Fātiḥa).

== Practices ==
=== Marriage ===
Unlike other religions, inter-faith marriages are recognized by the community. In addition to the other Abrahamic faiths, some Nizari Ismailis of South Asian descent have married those of Dharmic faiths, such as Hinduism, Buddhism, and Jainism, as well as other religions, such as Sikhism and Zoroastrianism. The Aga Khan IV said that he had no objection to such marriages, and met non-Ismaili spouses and children during his various deedars throughout the world. In fact, many members of his family, including his daughter Princess Zahra Aga Khan, have married non-Ismailis in inter-faith ceremonies. Child marriages are strictly prohibited. The Aga Khan IV also condemned polygamy, except in certain circumstances.

=== Fasting ===
Unlike the other branches of Islam, Nizari Isma'ilis divide the Ramadan fast ibāṭinī ṣawm (esoteric fasting) refers to the abstention from communicating the esoteric knowledge of revelation (tanzīl) and interpretation (ta’wīl) to those who are not ready to receive it.

A second kind of fasting known as ḥaqīqī ṣawm (real fasting) is the abstention from anything (in thought, word, or deed) which is contrary to the Command of God. This kind is observed year-round.

== Aga Khan Development Network ==
The Aga Khan Development Network (AKDN) was set up by the Imamate and the Ismaili community as a group of private, non-denominational development agencies that seek to empower communities and individuals, regardless of ethnicity or religious affiliation, and seek to improve living conditions and opportunities within the developing world. It has active working relationships with international organizations such as the United Nations (UN) and the European Union (EU), and private organizations such as the Bill & Melinda Gates Foundation. Governmental bodies the AKDN works with include the United States Agency for International Development, the Canadian International Development Agency, the United Kingdom's Department for International Development, and Germany's Federal Ministry of Economic Cooperation and Development. It's also known that the Aga Khan Development Network is funded by donations and offerings given by the followers of the Aga Khan.

=== Agencies ===
- Aga Khan Agency for Microfinance (AKAM)
- Aga Khan Education Services (AKES)
- Aga Khan Foundation (AKF)
- Aga Khan Fund for Economic Development (AKFED)
- Aga Khan Health Services (AKHS)
- Aga Khan Planning and Building Services (AKPBS)
- Aga Khan Trust for Culture (AKTC)
- Aga Khan University (AKU)
- Focus Humanitarian Assistance (FOCUS)
- Global Centre for Pluralism
- University of Central Asia (UCA)

== See also ==
- Batiniyya
- Fatimid
- Ginans
- Hashshashin
- Imamate in Ismaili doctrine
- Imamate in Shia doctrine
- Nizari Ismaili state
- Nūram Mūbin
- Shia Islam in Africa
- Sufism
