= History of Islam =

The history of Islam is believed, by historians, to have originated with the Islamic prophet Muhammad's mission in Mecca and Medina at the start of the 7th century CE, although Muslims regard this time as a return to the original faith passed down by the Abrahamic prophets, such as Adam, Noah, Abraham, Moses, David, Solomon, and Jesus, with the submission (Islām) to the will of God. The study of early Islamic history—spanning the period up to the rise of the Abbasids—based on insufficient objective data, combined with varying methodological approaches to traditional sources, has given rise to revisionist historical theses. These challenge the (conservative) narrative that the faith originated from a single root and spread across diverse regions; instead, they propose that the story is a construct built retrospectively by piecing together elements developed in different locales—such as texts, legal codes, genealogies, (Note: Modern historians don't take the Family tree as a fact. In the pre-Islamic (and early Islamic) period, (Note: The ayyām circulated earlier as scattered oral materials, the formation of the genre as a distinct textual corpus is attributed to the Basran grammarian and lexicographer Abū ʿUbayda Maʿmar b. al-Muthannā (110–209/728–824).) genealogical trees were a product of the oral tradition of the Days of the Arabs, shaped according to social needs and the interests of the listeners. (Note: Among Bedouin and semi-Bedouin communities, the ayyām (Days) were transmitted as forms of oral tribal history, comparable to other tribal oral historiographical traditions. This mode of transmission rendered the narratives plastic and flexible, allowing them to be reshaped according to present social expectations and the interaction between performer and audience.) Contemporary historiography unveiled the lack of inner coherence of this genealogical system and demonstrated that it finds insufficient matching evidence; the distinction between Qahtanites and Adnanites is believed to be a product of the Umayyad Age, when the war of factions (al-niza al-hizbi) was raging in the young Islamic Empire.) and anecdotes—and suggest that the actual history is best explained through evolutionary-syncretic models of varying nuances.

The early Muslim conquests taking place across the vast territories—which could be considered empty space—of Arabia, as well as over the expansive lands of two empires in the north that were collapsing under their own weight were responsible for the spread of Islam. Revisionists characterize this as a form of secular Arab expansionism, adding that the extraordinary human stories and archetypes from the early Islamic period were fabricated to construct the religious rhetoric of this expansion and to address contemporary needs. By the 8th century CE, the Umayyad Caliphate extended from al-Andalus in the west to the Indus River in the east. Polities such as those ruled by the Umayyad and Abbasid caliphates (in the Middle East and later in Spain and Southern Italy), the Fatimids, Seljuks, Ayyubids, and Mamluks were among the most influential powers in the world. Highly Persianized empires built by the Samanids, Ghaznavids, and Ghurids significantly contributed to technological and administrative developments. The Islamic Golden Age gave rise to many centers of culture and science and produced notable polymaths, astronomers, mathematicians, physicians, and philosophers during the Middle Ages.

By the early 13th century, the Delhi Sultanate conquered the northern Indian subcontinent, while Turkic dynasties like the Sultanate of Rum and Artuqids conquered much of Anatolia from the Byzantine Empire throughout the 11th and 12th centuries. In the 13th and 14th centuries, destructive Mongol invasions, along with the loss of population due to the Black Death, greatly weakened the traditional centers of the Muslim world, stretching from Persia to Egypt, but saw the emergence of the Timurid Renaissance and major economic powers such as the Mali Empire in West Africa and the Bengal Sultanate in South Asia. Following the deportation and enslavement of the Muslim Moors from the Emirate of Sicily and elsewhere in southern Italy, the Islamic Iberia was gradually conquered by Christian forces during the Reconquista. In the early modern period, the gunpowder empires—the Ottomans, Timurids, Mughals, and Safavids—emerged as world powers.

During the 19th and early 20th centuries, most of the Muslim world fell under the influence or direct control of the European Great Powers. Some of their efforts to win independence and build modern nation-states over the course of the last two centuries continue to reverberate to the present day, as well as fuel conflict-zones in the MENA region, such as Afghanistan, Central Africa, Chechnya, Iraq, Kashmir, Libya, Palestine, Syria, Somalia, Xinjiang, and Yemen. The oil boom stabilized the Arab States of the Gulf Cooperation Council (comprising Bahrain, Kuwait, Oman, Qatar, Saudi Arabia, and the United Arab Emirates), making them the world's largest oil producers and exporters, which focus on capitalism, free trade, and tourism.

== Early sources and historiography ==
Most Islamic history was transmitted orally until after the rise of the Abbasid Caliphate. At the same time the study of the earliest periods in Islamic history is made difficult by a lack of sources. The stories were written in the form of "founding conquest stories" based on nostalgia for the golden age then. Humphrey, quoted by Antoine Borrut, explains that the stories related to this period were created according to a pact-betrayal-redemption principle. One of the most important historical sources for which the above-mentioned stories about the birth of Islam were compiled is the work of the Muslim historian Abū Jaʿfar al-Ṭabarī (839–923 CE). Although the sources concerning the Sasanian realm of influence for the 6th century AD, which represents the time period before the beginning of Islam according to the traditional understanding, are poor, the sources for the Byzantine provinces of Syria and Iraq in the same period, complemented by Syriac Christian writings, provide a relatively better quality. Regarding the depicting of early Islamic history, four trends are prominent concerning the utilization on available (irrational) sources;

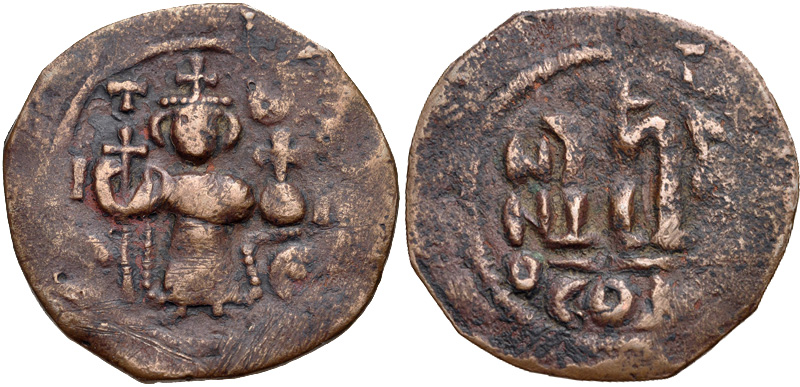
A "Pseudo-Byzantine" coin with depictions of the Byzantine Emperor Constans II holding the cross-tipped staff and globus cruciger. According to archaeological data, there was no one theological identity and stance with sharp boundaries in the early Islamic period. (Note: Suliman Bashear argues that it is unlikely that the Arab invasion and conquest could have effected "such changes in world affairs within so short a span of time" that the diversity in "languages, ethnicities, cultures, and religions" were "suddenly swallowed up by Arabian Islam in the early seventh century" as Arabic historical sources of the third AH/ninth CE. century described. And that it is much more likely that Arab invasion preceded "Arabian Islam as we know it" and that Islam was fused with the Arab polity sometime after "the beginning of the second/eighth century".)

- The descriptive method uses the outlines of Islamic traditions, adjusted for the stories of miracles and faith-centred claims within those sources. Edward Gibbon (1737–1794) and Gustav Weil (1808–1889) represent some of the first historians following the descriptive method.
- In the source critical method, scholars compare all available sources in order to identify which informants to the sources are weak and thereby to distinguish spurious material. The work of William Montgomery Watt (1909–2006) and that of Wilferd Madelung (1930–2023) exemplify source-critical study.
- In the tradition critical method, the sources are believed to be based on oral traditions with unclear origins and transmission history, and so are treated very cautiously. Ignác Goldziher (1850–1921) pioneered the tradition critical method, and Uri Rubin (1944–2021) continued this approach.
- The skeptical method doubts nearly all of the material in the traditional sources, regarding any possible historical core as too difficult to decipher from distorted and fabricated material. An early example of the sceptical method was the work of John Wansbrough (1928–2002).

Nowadays, the popularity of the different methods employed varies on the scope of the studies produced. Overview treatments of the history of early Islam tend to take the descriptive approach. Scholars who look at the beginnings of Islam in depth generally follow the source-critical and tradition-critical methods. Until the early 1970s, Non-Muslim scholars of Islamic studies—while not accepting mythical accounts, such as divine intervention—did accept its origin story in most of its details. Critical evaluation of sources is of particular importance in uncovering Muhammad's historical existence beyond the myths. Early sources for the life of Muhammad are authors from the 2nd and 3rd centuries AH (8th and 9th centuries CE), whose works constructed main biographical information to the Muslim traditions regarding his life, but the reliability of this information is very much debated in academic circles due to the oral gap between the recorded dates of Muhammad's life and the dates when these writings begin to appear in sources. John Burton summarizes the information provided by the multitude of available sources, from a historian's perspective: states

In judging the content, the only resort of the scholar is to the yardstick of probability, and on this basis, it must be repeated, virtually nothing of use to the historian emerges from the sparse record of the early life of the founder of the latest of the great world religions ... so, however far back in the Muslim tradition one now attempts to reach, one simply cannot recover a scrap of information of real use in constructing the human history of Muhammad, beyond the bare fact that he once existed.

The quality of historical sources improves after the 8th century CE. Those sources which treated earlier times with a large temporal and cultural gap now begin to give accounts which are more contemporaneous, the quality of genre of available historical accounts improves, and new documentary sources—such as official documents, correspondence and poetry—appear.

== Inception ==
Map of the tribes of Arabia in late antiquity

Early Islam arose within the historical, social, political, economic, and religious context of late antiquity in the Middle East. Religion in pre-Islamic Arabia may be summarized as follows: Judaism became the dominant religion of the Himyarite Kingdom in Yemen after about 380 CE, while Christianity took root in the Persian Gulf. The second half of the 6th century CE saw political disorder in pre-Islamic Arabia, and communication routes were no longer secure. Religious divisions played an important role in the crisis. There was also a yearning for a more "spiritual form of religion", and "the choice of religion increasingly became an individual rather than a collective issue." While some Arabs were reluctant to convert to a foreign faith, those Abrahamic religions provided "the principal intellectual and spiritual reference points", and Jewish and Christian loanwords from Aramaic began to replace the old pagan vocabulary of Arabic throughout the peninsula.

The Ḥanīf ("renunciates"), a group of monotheists that sought to separate themselves both from the foreign Abrahamic religions and the traditional Arab polytheism, were looking for a new religious worldview to replace the pre-Islamic Arabian religions, focusing on "the all-encompassing father god Allah whom they freely equated with the Jewish Yahweh and the Christian Jehovah." In their view, Mecca was originally dedicated to this monotheistic faith that they considered to be the one true religion, established by the patriarch Abraham. However, the polytheistic Kaaba temple in Mecca was a popular pilgrimage site and for this reason an important source of income for the surrounding pagan Arabs in those days.

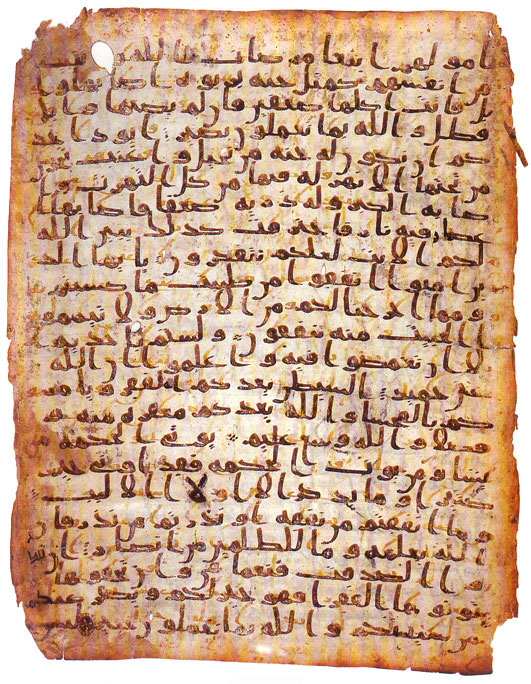
A page from the Sanaa manuscript, with "subtexts" revealed under UV, very different from contemporary editions of the Quran. Puin argues that these variants indicate an evolving text, not a fixed one.

According to the traditional account, Muhammad was born in Mecca, an important caravan trading center, around the year 570 CE. His family belonged to the Arab clan of Quraysh, which was the chief tribe of Mecca and a dominant force in Hejaz region. They supported the establishment of sacred months in which all violence was prohibited and travel was safe, in order to prevent tribal raids for loot, to sustain the Hajj trade. Like the Ḥanīf, Muhammad practiced Taḥannuth, spending time in seclusion at the Cave Hira in the mountain Jabal al-Nour and "turning away from paganism." In 610 CE, when he was about 40 years old, he began receiving at mount Hira' what Muslims regard as divine revelations delivered through the angel Gabriel on the Laylat al-Qadr, which would later form the Quran. These inspirations urged him to proclaim a strict monotheistic faith, as the final expression of Biblical prophetism earlier codified in the sacred texts of Judaism and Christianity; to warn his compatriots of the impending Judgement Day; and to castigate social injustices of his city. (Note: "Key themes in these early recitations include the idea of the moral responsibility of man who was created by God and the idea of the judgment to take place on the day of resurrection. [...] Another major theme of Muhammad's early preaching, [... is that] there is a power greater than man's, and that the wise will acknowledge this power and cease their greed and suppression of the poor.") Muhammad's message won over a handful of followers (the ṣaḥāba) and was met with increasing persecution from Meccan notables. (Note: "At first Muhammad met with no serious opposition [...] He was only gradually led to attack on principle the gods of Mecca. [...] Meccan merchants then discovered that a religious revolution might be dangerous to their fairs and their trade.")

In 622 CE, a few years after losing protection with the death of his influential uncle ʾAbū Ṭālib ibn ʿAbd al-Muṭṭalib, Muhammad migrated to the city of Yathrib (subsequently called Medina) where he was joined by his followers. Later generations would count this event, known as the hijra, as the start of the Islamic era. The surahs of this period emphasized his place among the long line of Biblical prophets, but also differentiated the message of the Quran from the sacred texts of Christianity and Judaism. Armed conflict with the Arab Meccans and Jewish tribes of the Yathrib area soon broke out. After a series of military confrontations and political manoeuvres, Muhammad was able to secure control of Mecca and allegiance of the Quraysh in 629 CE, after which he ordered the destruction of pagan idols. In the time remaining until his death in 632 CE, tribal chiefs across the Arabian peninsula entered into various agreements with him, some under terms of alliance, others acknowledging his claims of prophethood and agreeing to follow Islamic practices, including paying the alms levy to his government, which consisted of a number of deputies, an army of believers, and a public treasury.

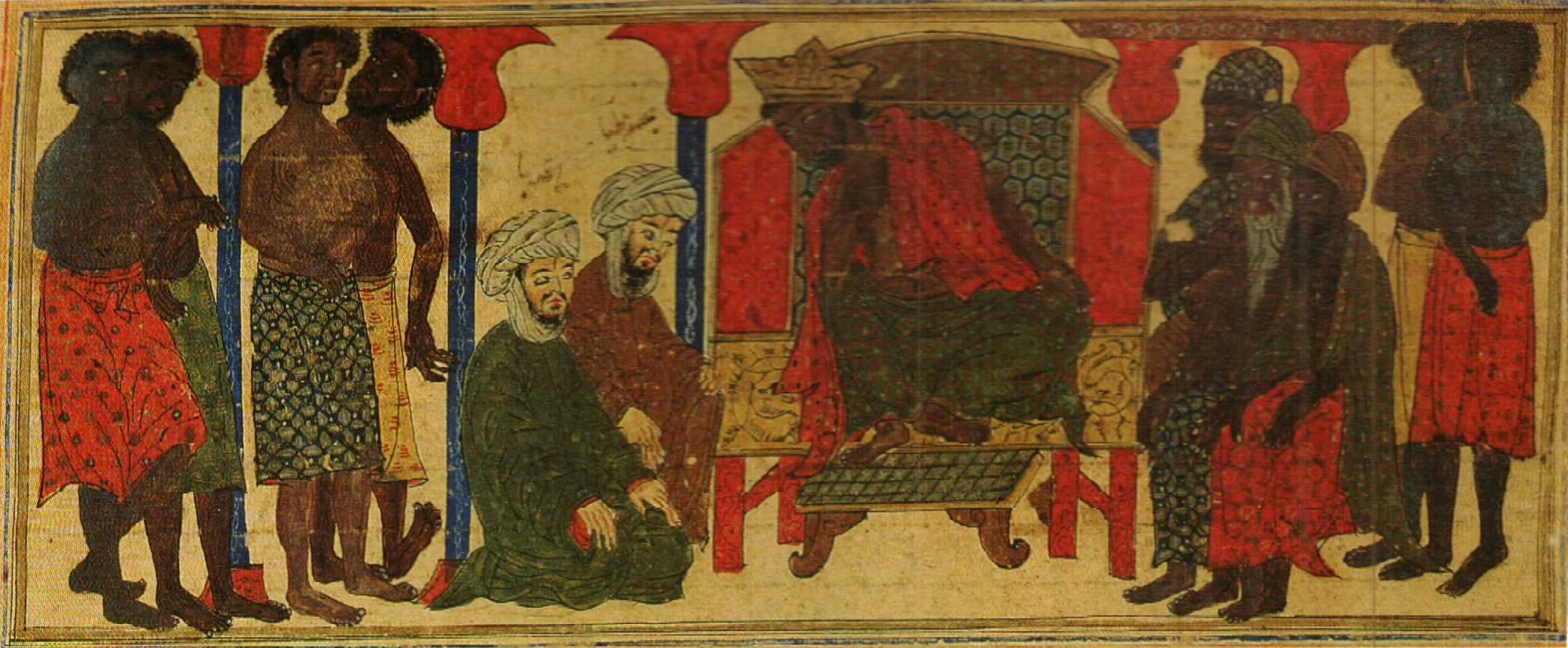
1314 Illustration by Rashid ad-Din, depicting the Negus of Medieval Abyssinia declining a Meccan delegation's request to surrender the early Muslims.

With an approach that has been developed and popularized recently, Muhammad established the first Islamic state in Medina and made radical reforms to create an Islamic society based on Quranic verses, in line with the new concept, and the Constitution of Medina, in which the rights and duties of the different communities were determined. The compatibility of the concept of the state, which essentially has the power to coerce, with religion and prophethood, which are essentially advice, is a controversial issue. (See also:Al-Baqara 256) The real intentions of Muhammad regarding the spread of Islam, its political undertone, and his missionary activity (da'wah) during his lifetime are a contentious matter of debate, which has been extensively discussed both among Muslim scholars and Non-Muslim scholars within the academic field of Islamic studies. Poston Larry states;

Was it in Muhammad's mind to produce a world religion or did his interests lie mainly within the confines of his homeland? Was he solely an Arab nationalist—a political genius intent upon uniting the tribal clans under the banner of a new religion—or was his vision a truly international one, a desire to produce a reformed humanity in the midst of a new world order? These questions are not without significance, for a number of the proponents of contemporary da'wah activity trace their inspiration to the prophet himself.[...] Despite the claims of these writers, it is difficult to prove that Muhammad intended to found a world-encompassing faith superseding the religions of Christianity and Judaism. His original aim appears to have been the establishment of a succinctly Arab brand of monotheism, as indicated by his many references to the Qurʾān as an "Arabic book" and by his accommodations to other monotheistic traditions.

== Timeline of Islamic states ==
The following timeline can serve as a rough visual guide to the most important polities in the Islamic world prior to World War I. It covers major historical centers of power and culture, including the Arabian peninsula (modern-day Oman, Saudi Arabia, United Arab Emirates, and Yemen), Mesopotamia (modern-day Iraq), Persia (modern-day Iran), Levant (modern-day Syria, Lebanon, Jordan, and Israel/Palestine), Egypt, the Maghreb (north-west Africa), the Sahel, the Swahili Coast, Somalia, southern Iberia (al-Andalus), Transoxania (Central Asia), Hindustan (including modern-day North India, Bangladesh, and Pakistan), and Anatolia (modern-day Turkey). It is necessarily an approximation, since rule over some regions was sometimes divided among different centers of power, and authority in larger polities was often distributed among several dynasties. For example, during the later stages of the Abbasid Caliphate, even the capital city of Baghdad was effectively ruled by other dynasties such as the Buyyids and the Seljuks, while the Ottoman Turks commonly delegated executive authority over outlying provinces to local potentates, such as the Deys of Algiers, the Beys of Tunis, and the Mamluks of Iraq.

Dates are approximate, consult particular articles for details.

== Rashidun Caliphate ==
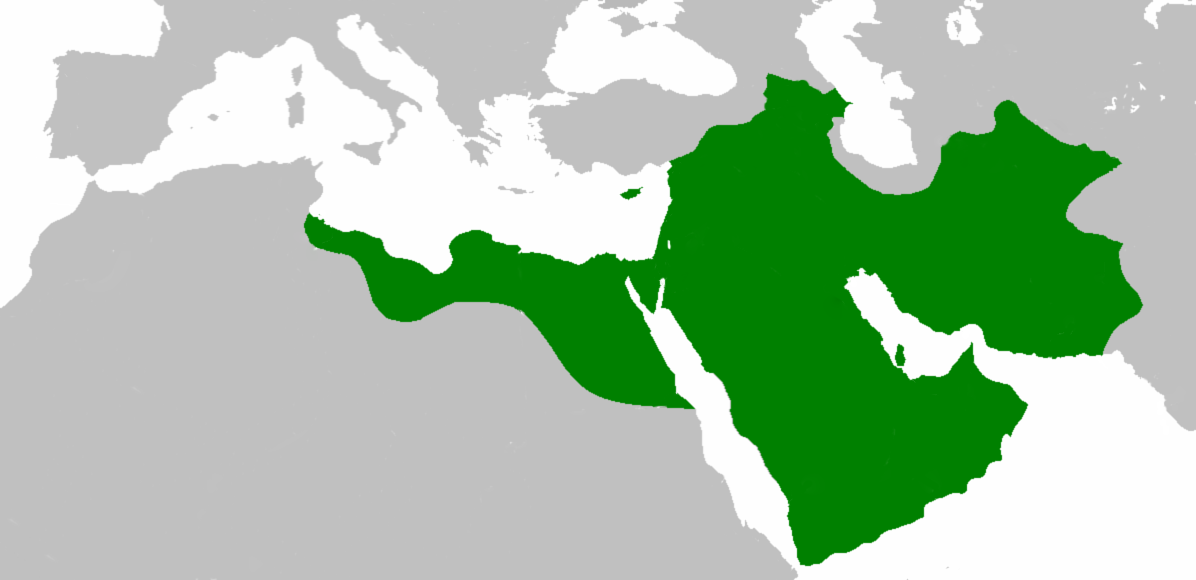
Empire of the Rāshidūn Caliphate at its peak under the third rāshidūn caliph ʿUthmān (654 CE) Strongholds of the Rāshidūn Caliphate

By the time Muhammad died c. 11 AH (632 CE), almost all the tribes of the Arabian Peninsula had converted to Islam. Disagreement broke out over who would succeed him as leader of the Muslim community, giving rise to the title of caliph (Arabic: خَليفة, romanized: khalīfa, lit. 'successor'). Thus, the subsequent Islamic empires were known as "caliphates", and a series of four caliphs governed the early Islamic empire: Abū Bakr (632–634), ʿUmar ibn al-Khaṭṭāb (Umar І, 634–644), ʿUthmān ibn ʿAffān (644–656), and ʿAlī ibn Abī Ṭālib (656–661). These leaders are known as the rāshidūn ("rightly-guided") caliphs in Sunnī Islam. The Rashidun Caliphate oversaw the initial phase of the early Muslim conquests, advancing through Persia, the Levant, Egypt, and North Africa.

Alongside the growth of the Umayyad Caliphate, the major political development within early Islam in this period was the sectarian split and political divide between Kharijite, Sunnī, and Shīʿa Muslims; this had its roots in a dispute over the succession for the role of caliph. Sunnīs believed the caliph was elective and any Muslim from the Arab clan of Quraysh, the tribe of Muhammad, might serve as one. Shīʿītes, on the other hand, believed the title of caliph should be hereditary in the bloodline of Muhammad, and thus all the caliphs, with the exceptions of Muhammad's cousin and son-in-law ʿAlī ibn Abī Ṭālib and his firstborn son Ḥasan, were actually illegitimate usurpers. However, the Sunnī sect emerged as triumphant in most regions of the Muslim world, with the exceptions of Iran and Oman. Muhammad's closest companions (ṣaḥāba), the four "rightly-guided" caliphs who succeeded him, continued to expand the Islamic empire to encompass Jerusalem, Ctesiphon, and Damascus, and sending Arab Muslim armies as far as the Sindh region. The early Islamic empire stretched from al-Andalus (Muslim Iberia) to the Punjab region under the reign of the Umayyad dynasty.

After Muhammad's death, Abū Bakr, one of his closest associates, was chosen as the first caliph ("successor"). Although the office of caliph retained an aura of religious authority, it laid no claim to prophecy. A number of tribal Arab leaders refused to extend the agreements made with Muhammad to Abū Bakr, ceasing payments of the alms levy and in some cases claiming to be prophets in their own right. Abū Bakr asserted his authority in a successful military campaign known as the Ridda wars, whose momentum was carried into the lands of the Byzantine and Sasanian empires. By the end of the reign of the second caliph ʿUmar ibn al-Khaṭṭāb, the Arab Muslim armies, whose battle-hardened ranks were now swelled by the defeated rebels and former imperial auxiliary troops, invaded the eastern Byzantine provinces of Syria and Egypt, while the Sasanids lost their western territories, with the rest of Persia to follow soon afterwards.

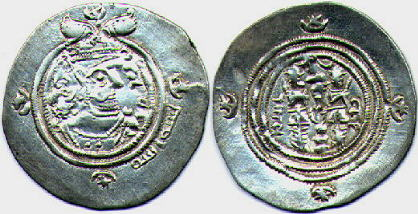
Sasanid style coins during the Rashidun period, unlike known historical figures such as Ibn Zubayr and Mu'awiya I, there are no coins minted in the name of these caliphs that could be evidence of political predominancy. (crescent-star, fire altar, depictions of Khosrow II, Arabic bismillāh in margin)

ʿUmar ibn al-Khaṭṭāb improved the administration of the fledgling Islamic empire, ordering improvement of irrigation networks, and playing a role in foundation of cities like Basra. To be close to the poor, he lived in a simple mud hut without doors and walked the streets every evening. After consulting with the poor, ʿUmar established the Bayt al-mal, a welfare institution for the Muslim and Non-Muslim poor, needy, elderly, orphans, widows, and the disabled. The Bayt al-mal ran for hundreds of years under the Rāshidūn Caliphate in the 7th century CE and continued through the Umayyad period and well into the Abbasid era. ʿUmar also introduced child benefit for the children and pensions for the elderly. When he felt that a governor or a commander was becoming attracted to wealth or did not meet the required administrative standards, he had him removed from his position. The expansion was partially halted between 638 and 639 CE during the years of great famine and plague in Arabia and the Levant, respectively, but by the end of ʿUmar's reign, Syria, Egypt, Mesopotamia, and much of Persia were incorporated into the early Islamic empire.

Local populations of Jews and indigenous Christians, who lived as religious minorities and were forced to pay the jizya tax under the Muslim rule in order to finance the wars with Byzantines and Sasanids, often aided Muslims to take over their lands from the Byzantines and Persians, resulting in exceptionally speedy conquests. As new areas were conquered, they also benefited from free trade with other areas of the growing Islamic empire, where, to encourage commerce, taxes were applied to wealth rather than trade. The Muslims paid zakat on their wealth for the benefit of the poor. Since the Constitution of Medina, drafted by Muhammad, the Jews and the Christians continued to use their own laws and had their own judges.

In 639 CE, ʿUmar appointed Muawiyah ibn Abi Sufyan as the governor of Syria after the previous governor died in a plague along with 25,000 other people. To stop the Byzantine harassment from the sea during the Arab–Byzantine wars, in 649 Muawiyah set up a navy, with ships crewed by Monophysite Christians, Egyptian Coptic Christians, and Jacobite Syrian Christians sailors and Muslim troops, which defeated the Byzantine navy at the Battle of the Masts in 655 CE, opening up the Mediterranean Sea to Muslim ships.

Eastern territories of the Byzantine Empire invaded by the Arab Muslims during the Arab–Byzantine wars (650 CE)

Early Muslim armies stayed in encampments away from cities because ʿUmar feared that they may get attracted to wealth and luxury, moving away from the worship of God, accumulating wealth and establishing dynasties. Staying in these encampments away from the cities also ensured that there was no stress on the local populations which could remain autonomous. Some of these encampments later grew into cities like Basra and Kufa in Iraq and Fustat in Egypt.

When ʿUmar was assassinated in 644 CE, ʿUthmān ibn ʿAffān, second cousin and twice son-in-law of Muhammad, became the third caliph. As the Arabic language is written without vowels, speakers of different Arabic dialects and other languages recited the Quran with phonetic variations that could alter the meaning of the text. When ʿUthmān became aware of this, he ordered a standard copy of the Quran to be prepared. Begun during his reign, the compilation of the Quran was finished some time between 650 and 656 CE, and copies were sent out to the different centers of the expanding Islamic empire. After Muhammad's death, the old tribal differences between the Arabs started to resurface. Following the Roman–Persian wars and the Byzantine-Sasanian wars, deep-rooted differences between Iraq (formerly under the Sasanian Empire) and Syria (formerly under the Byzantine Empire) also existed. Each wanted the capital of the newly established Islamic empire to be in their area.

As ʿUthmān became very old, Marwan I, a relative of Muawiyah slipped into the vacuum, becoming his secretary and slowly assuming more control. When ʿUthmān was assassinated in 656 CE, ʿAlī ibn Abī Ṭālib, cousin and son-in-law of Muhammad, assumed the position of caliph and moved the capital to Kufa in Iraq. Muawiyah I, the governor of Syria, and Marwan I demanded arrest of the culprits. Conflict resulted in the first Muslim civil war (the "First Fitna"). ʿAlī was assassinated by the Kharijites in 661 CE. Six months later, ʿAlī's firstborn son Ḥasan made a peace treaty with Muawiyah I, in the interest of peace. In the Hasan–Muawiya treaty, Ḥasan ibn ʿAlī handed over power to Muawiyah I on the condition that he would be just to the people and not establish a dynasty after his death. Muawiyah I subsequently broke the conditions of the agreement and established the Umayyad dynasty, with a capital in Damascus. Ḥusayn ibn ʿAlī, by then Muhammad's only surviving grandson, refused to swear allegiance to the Umayyads; he was killed in the Battle of Karbala the same year, in an event still mourned by Shīʿa Muslims on the Day of Ashura. Political unrest called the second Muslim civil war (the "Second Fitna") continued, but Muslim rule was extended under Muawiyah I to Rhodes, Crete, Kabul, Bukhara, and Samarkand, and expanded into North Africa. In 664 CE, Arab Muslim armies conquered Kabul, and in 665 CE pushed further into the Maghreb.

== Umayyad Caliphate ==
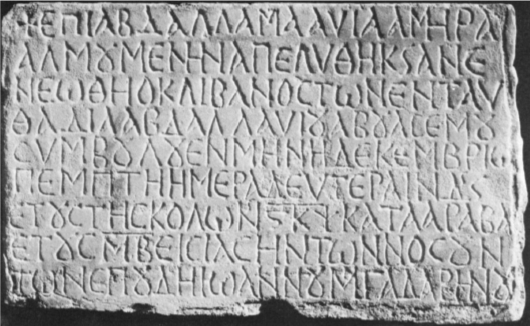
A Greek inscription crediting Mu'awiya for restoring the Roman-era bath facilities at Hamat Gader in 663, the sole epigraphic attestation of Mu'awiya's rule in Syria

The Umayyad dynasty (or Ommiads), whose name derives from Umayya ibn Abd Shams, the great-grandfather of the first Umayyad caliph, ruled from 661 to 750 CE. Although the Umayyad family came from the city of Mecca, Damascus was the capital. After the death of Abdu'l-Rahman ibn Abu Bakr in 666, Muawiyah I consolidated his power. Muawiyah I moved his capital to Damascus from Medina, which led to profound changes in the empire. In the same way, at a later date, the transfer of the Caliphate from Damascus to Baghdad marked the accession of a new family to power.

As the state grew, the state expenses increased. Additionally the Bayt al-mal and the Welfare State expenses to assist the Muslim and the non-Muslim poor, needy, elderly, orphans, widows, and the disabled, increased, the Umayyads asked the new converts (mawali) to continue paying the poll tax. The Umayyad rule, with its wealth and luxury also seemed at odds with the Islamic message preached by Muhammad. All this increased discontent. The descendants of Muhammad's uncle Abbas ibn Abd al-Muttalib rallied discontented mawali, poor Arabs, and some Shi'a against the Umayyads and overthrew them with the help of the general Abu Muslim, inaugurating the Abbasid dynasty in 750, which moved the capital to Baghdad. A branch of the Umayyad family fled across North Africa to Al-Andalus, where they established the Caliphate of Córdoba, which lasted until 1031 before falling due to the Fitna of al-Andalus. The Bayt al-mal, the Welfare State then continued under the Abbasids.

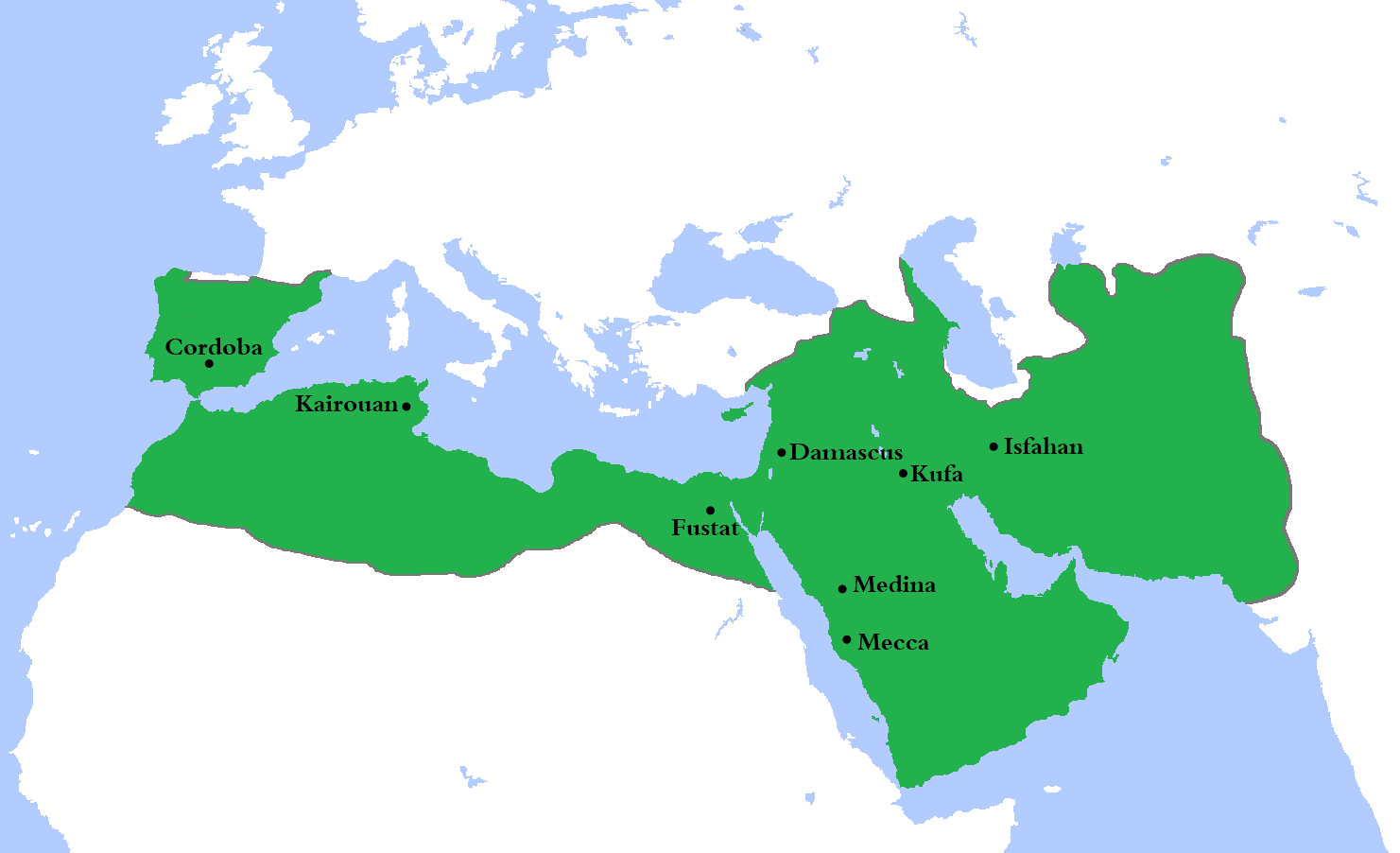
Territories of the Umayyad Caliphate

At its largest extent, the Umayyad dynasty covered more than 5,000,000 square miles (13,000,000 km^{2}) making it one of the largest empires the world had yet seen, and the fifth largest contiguous empire ever.

Muawiyah beautified Damascus, and developed a court to rival that of Constantinople. He expanded the frontiers of the empire, reaching the edge of Constantinople at one point, though the Byzantines drove him back and he was unable to hold any territory in Anatolia. Sunni Muslims credit him with saving the fledgling Muslim nation from post-civil war anarchy. However, Shia Muslims accuse him of instigating the war, weakening the Muslim nation by dividing the Ummah, fabricating self-aggrandizing heresies slandering Muhammad's family and even selling his Muslim critics into slavery in the Byzantine empire. One of Muawiyah's most controversial and enduring legacies was his decision to designate his son Yazid as his successor. According to Shi'a doctrine, this was a clear violation of the treaty he made with Hasan ibn Ali. In 682, Yazid restored Uqba ibn Nafi as the governor of North Africa. Uqba won battles against the Berbers and Byzantines. From there Uqba marched thousands of miles westward towards Tangier, where he reached the Atlantic coast, and then marched eastwards through the Atlas Mountains. With about 300 cavalrymen, he proceeded towards Biskra where he was ambushed by a Berber force under Kaisala. Uqba and all his men died fighting. The Berbers attacked and drove Muslims from north Africa for a period. Weakened by the civil wars, the Umayyad lost supremacy at sea, and had to abandon the islands of Rhodes and Crete. Under the rule of Yazid I, some Muslims in Kufa began to think that if Husayn ibn Ali the descendant of Muhammad was their ruler, he would have been more just. He was invited to Kufa but was later betrayed and killed. Imam Husain's son, Imam Ali ibn Husain, was imprisoned along with Husain's sister and other ladies left in Karbala war. Due to opposition by public they were later released and allowed to go to their native place Medina. One Imam after another continued in the generation of Imam Husain but they were opposed by the Caliphs of the day as their rivals till Imam Abdullah al-Mahdi Billah came in power as first Caliph of Fatimid in North Africa when Caliphate and Imamate came to same person again after Imam Ali. These Imams were recognized by Shia Islam taking Imam Ali as first Caliph/Imam and the same is institutionalized by the Safavids and many similar institutions named now as Ismaili, Twelver, etc.

Territory controlled by the contenders to the caliphate in 686, at the peak of the civil war.

The period under Muawiya II was marked by civil wars (Second Fitna). This would ease in the reign of Abd al-Malik ibn Marwan, a well-educated and capable ruler. Despite the many political problems that impeded his rule, all important records were translated into Arabic. In his reign, a currency for the Muslim world was minted. This led to war with the Byzantine Empire under Justinian II (Battle of Sebastopolis) in 692 in Asia Minor. The Byzantines were decisively defeated by the Caliph after the defection of a large contingent of Slavs. The Islamic currency was then made the exclusive currency in the Muslim world. He reformed agriculture and commerce. Abd al-Malik consolidated Muslim rule and extended it, made Arabic the state language, and organized a regular postal service.

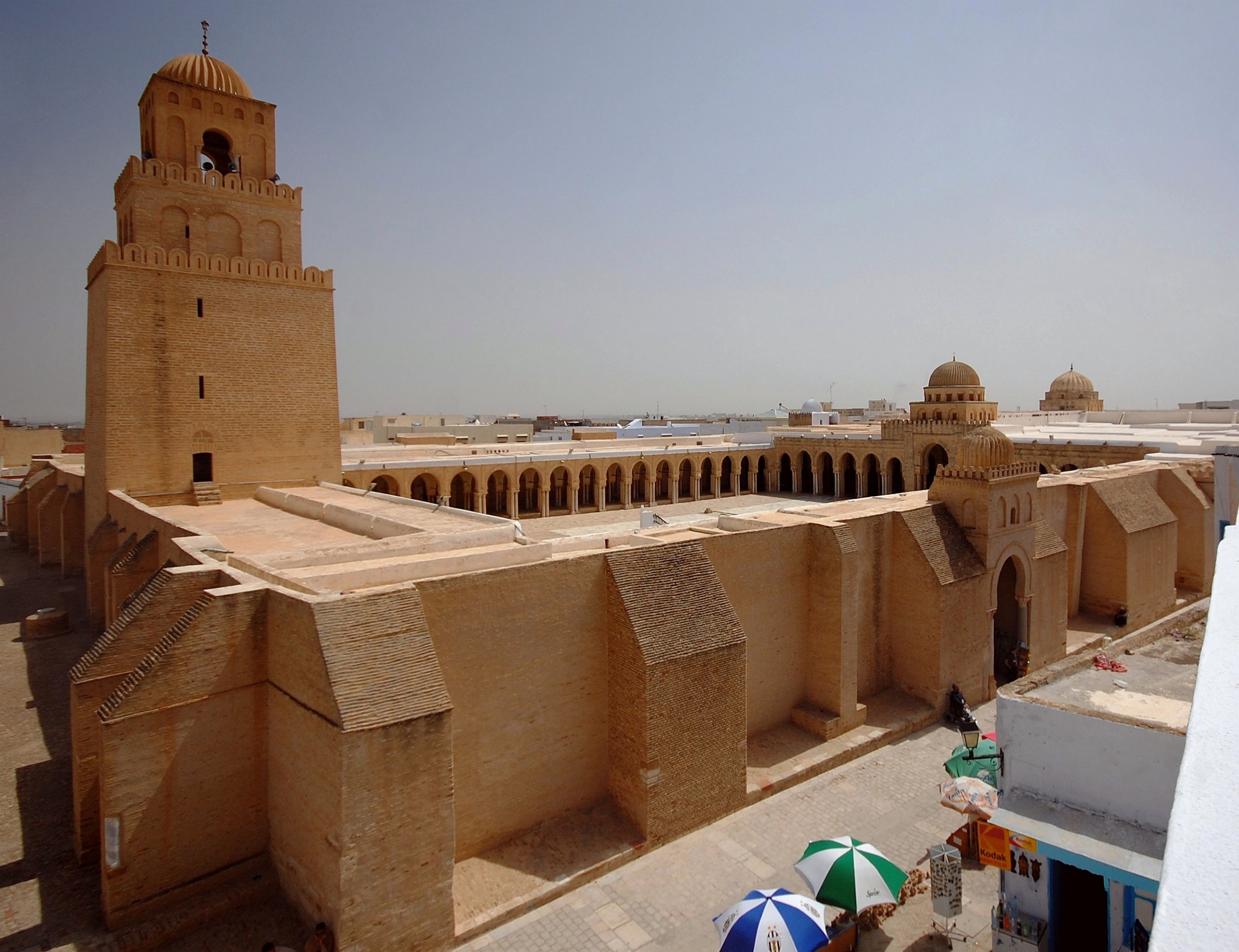
The Mosque of Uqba (Great Mosque of Kairouan), founded by the Umayyad general Uqba Ibn Nafi in 670, is the oldest and most prestigious mosque in the Muslim West; its present form dates from the 9th century, Kairouan, Tunisia.

Under Al-Walid, the caliphate empire stretched from the Iberian Peninsula to India. Al-Hajjaj ibn Yusuf played a crucial role in the organization and selection of military commanders. Al-Walid paid great attention to the expansion of an organized military, building the strongest navy in the Umayyad era. This tactic was crucial for the expansion to the Iberian Peninsula. His reign is considered to be the apex of Islamic power.

Sulayman ibn Abd al-Malik was hailed as caliph the day al-Walid died. He appointed Yazid ibn al-Muhallab governor of Mesopotamia. Sulayman ordered the arrest and execution of the family of al-Hajjaj, one of two prominent leaders (the other was Qutayba ibn Muslim) who had supported the succession of al-Walid's son Yazid, rather than Sulayman. Al-Hajjaj had predeceased al-Walid, so he posed no threat. Qutaibah renounced allegiance to Sulayman, though his troops rejected his appeal to revolt. They killed him and sent his head to Sulayman. Sulayman did not move to Damascus on becoming Caliph, remaining in Ramla. Sulayman sent Maslama ibn Abd al-Malik to attack the Byzantine capital (siege of Constantinople). The intervention of Bulgaria on the Byzantine side proved decisive. The Muslims sustained heavy losses. Sulayman died suddenly in 717.

Yazid II came to power on the death of Umar II. Yazid fought the Kharijites, with whom Umar had been negotiating, and killed the Kharijite leader Shawdhab. In Yazid's reign, civil wars began in different parts of the empire. Yazid expanded the Caliphate's territory into the Caucasus, before dying in 724. Inheriting the caliphate from his brother, Hisham ibn Abd al-Malik ruled an empire with many problems. He was effective in addressing these problems, and in allowing the Umayyad empire to continue as an entity. His long rule was an effective one, and renewed reforms introduced by Umar II. Under Hisham's rule, regular raids against the Byzantines continued. In North Africa, Kharijite teachings combined with local restlessness to produce the Berber Revolt. He was also faced with a revolt by Zayd ibn Ali. Hisham suppressed both revolts. The Abbasids continued to gain power in Khurasan and Iraq. However, they were not strong enough to make a move yet. Some were caught and punished or executed by eastern governors. The Battle of Akroinon, a decisive Byzantine victory, was during the final campaign of the Umayyad dynasty. Hisham died in 743.

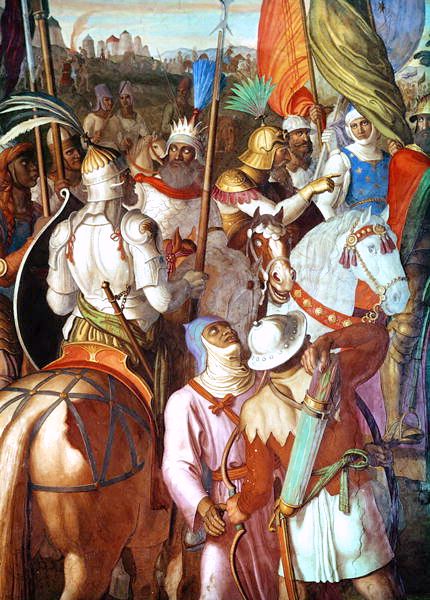
Umayyad army invades France after conquering the Iberian Peninsula

Al-Walid I began the next stage of Islamic conquests. Under him the early Islamic empire reached its farthest extent. He reconquered parts of Egypt from the Byzantine Empire and moved on into Carthage and across to the west of North Africa. Muslim armies under Tariq ibn Ziyad crossed the Strait of Gibraltar and began to conquer the Iberian Peninsula using North African Berber armies. The Visigoths of the Iberian Peninsula were defeated when the Umayyad conquered Lisbon. The Iberian Peninsula was the farthest extent of Islamic control of Europe (they were stopped at the Battle of Tours). In the east, Islamic armies under Muhammad ibn al-Qasim made it as far as the Indus Valley.

Al-Walid II saw political intrigue during his reign. Yazid III spoke out against his cousin Walid's "immorality" which included discrimination on behalf of the Banu Qays Arabs against Yemenis and non-Arab Muslims, and Yazid received further support from the Qadariya and Murji'iya (believers in human free will). Walid was shortly thereafter deposed in a coup. Yazid disbursed funds from the treasury and acceded to the Caliph. He explained that he had rebelled on behalf of the Book of God and the Sunna. Yazid reigned for only six months, while various groups refused allegiance and dissident movements arose, after which he died. Ibrahim ibn al-Walid, named heir apparent by his brother Yazid III, ruled for a short time in 744, before he abdicated. Marwan II ruled from 744 until he was killed in 750. He was the last Umayyad ruler to rule from Damascus. Marwan named his two sons Ubaydallah and Abdallah heirs. He appointed governors and asserted his authority by force. Anti-Umayyad feeling was very prevalent, especially in Iran and Iraq. The Abbasids had gained much support. Marwan's reign as caliph was almost entirely devoted to trying to keep the Umayyad empire together. His death signalled the end of Umayyad rule in the East, and was followed by the massacre of Umayyads by the Abbasids. Almost the entire Umayyad dynasty was killed, except for the talented prince Abd al-Rahman who escaped to the Iberian Peninsula and founded a dynasty there.

== Abbasid Caliphate ==
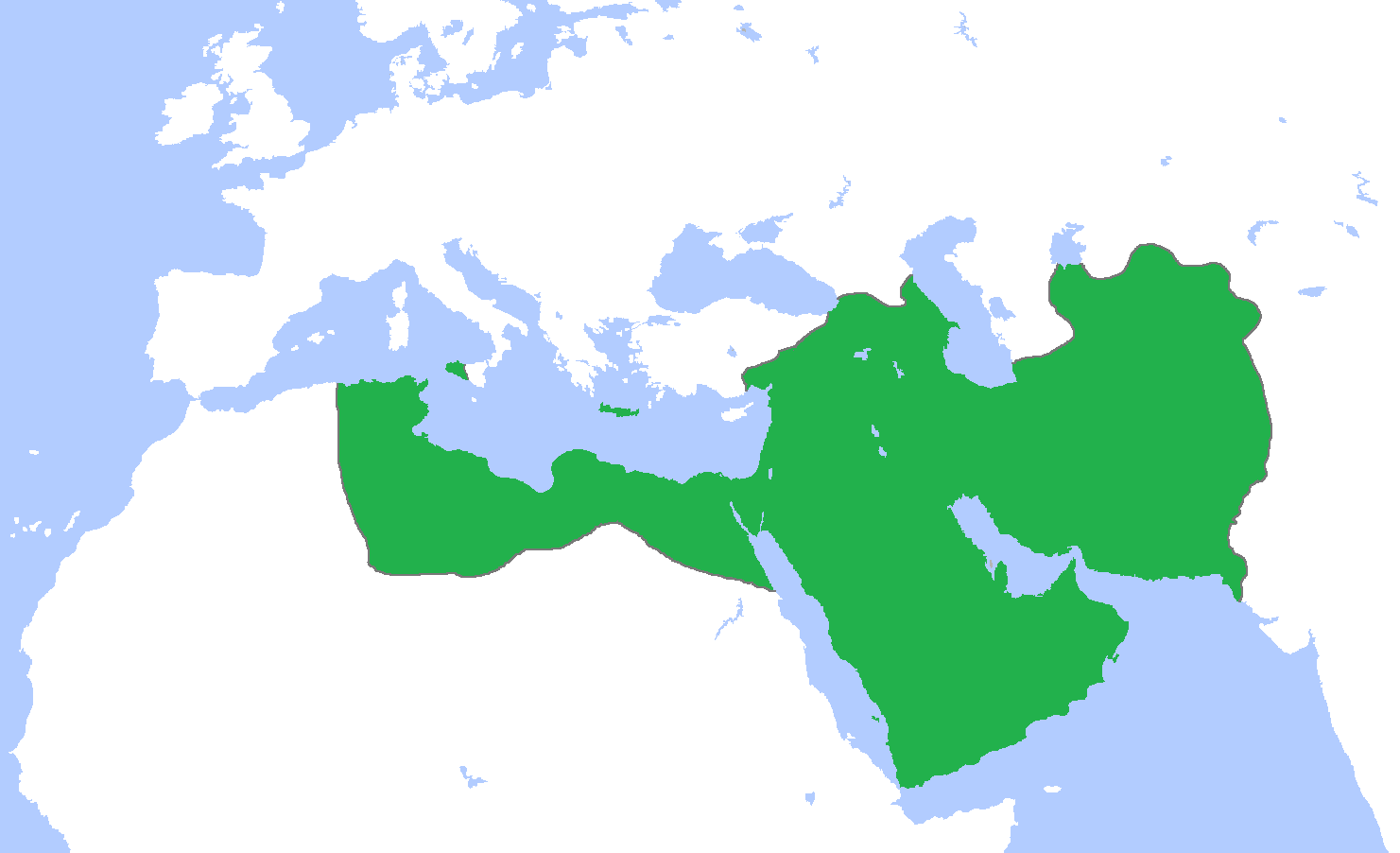
Abbasid Caliphate in the 850s

The Abbasid dynasty rose to power in 750, consolidating the gains of the earlier Caliphates. Initially, they conquered Mediterranean islands including the Balearics and, after, in 827 the Southern Italy. The ruling party had come to power on the wave of dissatisfaction with the Umayyads, cultivated by the Abbasid revolutionary Abu Muslim. Under the Abbasids Islamic civilization flourished. Most notable was the development of Arabic prose and poetry, termed by The Cambridge History of Islam as its "golden age". Commerce and industry (considered a Muslim Agricultural Revolution) and the arts and sciences (considered a Muslim Scientific Revolution) also prospered under Abbasid caliphs al-Mansur (ruled 754–775), Harun al-Rashid (ruled 786–809), al-Ma'mun (ruled 809–813) and their immediate successors. Many non-Muslims, such as Christians, Jews and Sabians, contributed to the Islamic civilization in various fields, and the institution known as the House of Wisdom employed Christian and Persian scholars to both translate works into Arabic and to develop new knowledge.

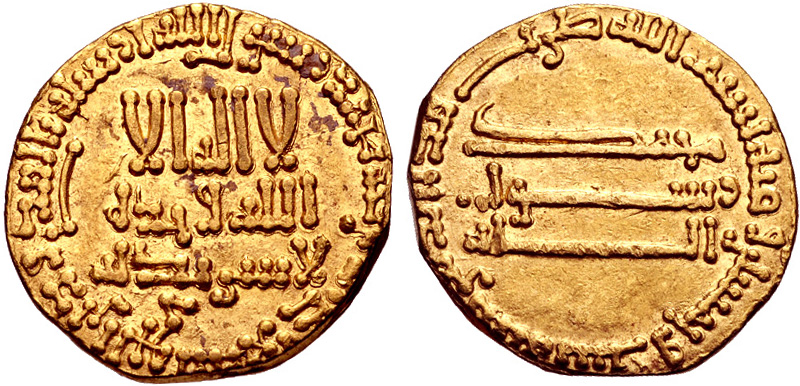
Gold dinar of Abbasid caliph Al-Mansur (r. 754–775) the founder of Baghdad, patron of art and science

The capital was moved from Damascus to Baghdad, due to the importance placed by the Abbasids upon eastern affairs in Persia and Transoxania. At this time the caliphate showed signs of fracture amid the rise of regional dynasties. Although the Umayyad family had been killed by the revolting Abbasids, one family member, Abd ar-Rahman I, escaped to Spain and established an independent caliphate there in 756. In the Maghreb, Harun al-Rashid appointed the Arab Aghlabids as virtually autonomous rulers, although they continued to recognize central authority. Aghlabid rule was short-lived, and they were deposed by the Shiite Fatimid dynasty in 909. By around 960, the Fatimids had conquered Abbasid Egypt, building a capital there in 973 called "al-Qahirah" (meaning "the planet of victory", known today as Cairo).

During its decline, the Abbasid Caliphate disintegrated into minor states and dynasties, such as the Tulunid and the Ghaznavid dynasty. The Ghaznavid dynasty was a Muslim dynasty established by Turkic slave-soldiers from another Islamic empire, the Samanid Empire. In Persia the Ghaznavids snatched power from the Abbasids. Abbasid influence had been consumed by the Great Seljuq Empire (a Muslim Turkish clan which had migrated into mainland Persia) by 1055. Two other Turkish tribes, the Karahanids and the Seljuks, converted to Islam during the 10th century. Later, they were subdued by the Ottomans, who share the same origin and language. The Seljuks played an important role in the revival of Sunnism when Shi'ism increased its influence. The Seljuk military leader Alp Arslan (1063 – 1072) financially supported sciences and literature and established the Nizamiyya of Baghdad.

Expansion continued, sometimes by force, sometimes by peaceful proselytising. The first stage in the conquest of India began just before the year 1000. By some 200 (from 1193 to 1209) years later, the area up to the Ganges river had fallen. In sub-Saharan West Africa, Islam was established just after the year 1000. Muslim rulers were in Kanem starting from sometime between 1081 and 1097, with reports of a Muslim prince at the head of Gao as early as 1009. The Islamic kingdoms associated with Mali reached prominence in the 13th century.

The Abbasids developed initiatives aimed at greater Islamic unity. Different sects of the Islamic faith and mosques, separated by doctrine, history, and practice, were pushed to cooperate. The Abbasids also distinguished themselves from the Umayyads by attacking the Umayyads' moral character and administration. According to Ira Lapidus, "The Abbasid revolt was supported largely by Arabs, mainly the aggrieved settlers of Marw with the addition of the Yemeni faction and their Mawali". The Abbasids also appealed to non-Arab Muslims, known as mawali, who remained outside the kinship-based society of the Arabs and were perceived as a lower class within the Umayyad empire. Islamic ecumenism, promoted by the Abbasids, refers to the idea of unity of the Ummah in the literal meaning: that there was a single faith. Islamic philosophy developed as the Shariah was codified, and the four Madhabs were established. This era also saw the rise of classical Sufism. Religious achievements included completion of the canonical collections of Hadith of Sahih Bukhari and others. Islam recognized to a certain extent the validity of the Abrahamic religions, the Quran identifying Jews, Christians, Zoroastrians, and Sabians (commonly identified with the Mandaeans) as "people of the book". Toward the beginning of the high Middle Ages, the doctrines of the Sunni and Shia, two major denominations of Islam, solidified and the divisions of the world theologically would form. These trends would continue into the Fatimid and Ayyubid periods.

Politically, the Abbasid Caliphate evolved into an Islamic monarchy (unitary system of government.) The regional Sultanate and Emirate governors' existence, validity, or legality were acknowledged for unity of the state. In the early Islamic philosophy of the Iberian Umayyads, Averroes presented an argument in The Decisive Treatise, providing a justification for the emancipation of science and philosophy from official Ash'ari theology; thus, Averroism has been considered a precursor to modern secularism.

=== Golden Baghdad Abbasids ===
Early Middle Ages

According to Arab sources in the year 750, Al-Saffah, the founder of the Abbasid Caliphate, launched a massive rebellion against the Umayyad Caliphate from the province of Khurasan near Talas. After eliminating the entire Umayyad family and achieving victory at the Battle of the Zab, Al-Saffah and his forces marched into Damascus and founded a new dynasty. His forces confronted many regional powers and consolidated the realm of the Abbasid Caliphate.

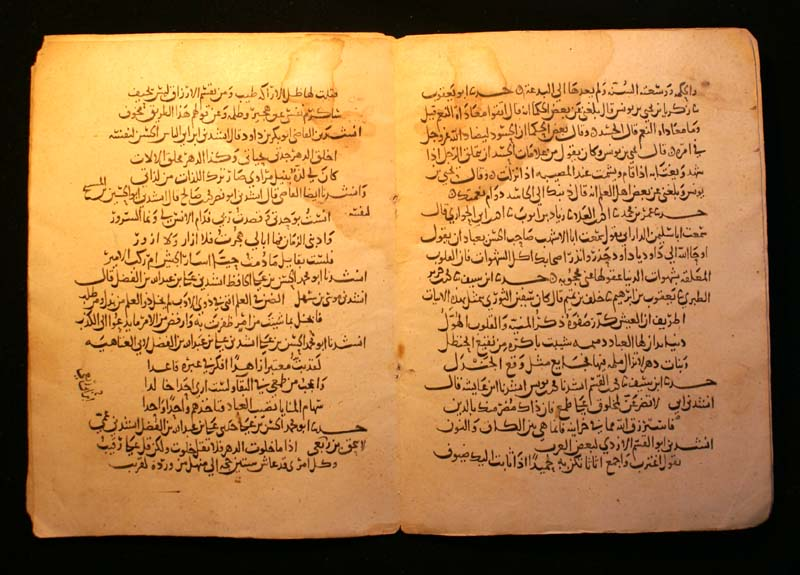
An Arabic manuscript written under the second half of the Abbasid Era.

In Al-Mansur's time, Persian scholarship emerged. Many non-Arabs converted to Islam. The Umayyads actively discouraged conversion in order to continue the collection of the jizya, or the tax on non-Muslims. Islam nearly doubled within its territory from 8% of residents in 750 to 15% by the end of Al-Mansur's reign. Al-Mahdi, whose name means "Rightly-guided" or "Redeemer", was proclaimed caliph when his father was on his deathbed. Baghdad blossomed during Al-Mahdi's reign, becoming the world's largest city. It attracted immigrants from Arabia, Iraq, Syria, Persia and as far away as India and Spain. Baghdad was home to Christians, Jews, Hindus, and Zoroastrians, in addition to the growing Muslim population. Like his father, Al-Hadi was open to his people and allowed citizens to address him in the palace at Baghdad. He was considered an "enlightened ruler", and continued the policies of his Abbasid predecessors. His short rule was plagued by military conflicts and internal intrigue.

The military conflicts subsided as Harun al-Rashid ruled. His reign was marked by scientific, cultural and religious prosperity. He established the library Bayt al-Hikma ("House of Wisdom"), and the arts and music flourished during his reign. The Barmakid family played a decisive advisorial role in establishing the Caliphate, but declined during Rashid's rule.

Al-Amin received the Caliphate from his father Harun Al-Rashid, but failed to respect the arrangements made for his brothers, leading to the Fourth Fitna. Al-Ma'mun's general Tahir ibn Husayn took Baghdad, executing Al-Amin. The war led to a loss of prestige for the dynasty.

=== Rise of regional powers ===
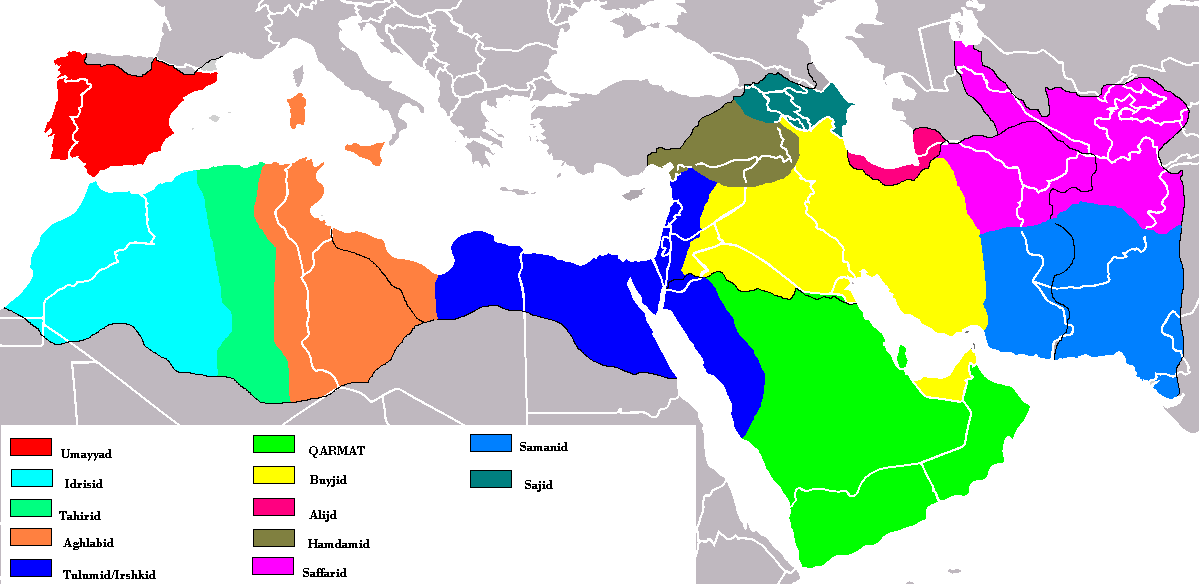
Regional powers born out of the fragmentation of the Abbasid caliphate

The Abbasids soon became caught in a three-way rivalry among Coptic Arabs, Indo-Persians, and immigrant Turks. In addition, the cost of running a large empire became too great. The Turks, Egyptians, and Arabs adhered to the Sunnite sect; the Persians, a great portion of the Turkic groups, and several of the princes in India were Shia. The political unity of Islam began to disintegrate. Under the influence of the Abbasid caliphs, independent dynasties appeared in the Muslim world and the caliphs recognized such dynasties as legitimately Muslim. The first was the Tahirids in Khorasan, which was founded during the caliph Al-Ma'mun's reign. Similar dynasties included the Saffarids, Samanids, Ghaznavids and Seljuqs. During this time, advancements were made in the areas of astronomy, poetry, philosophy, science, and mathematics.

=== High Baghdad Abbasids ===
Early Middle Ages

Upon Al-Amin's death, Al-Ma'mun became Caliph. Al-Ma'mun extended the Abbasid empire's territory during his reign and dealt with rebellions. Al-Ma'mun had been named governor of Khurasan by Harun, and after his ascension to power, the caliph named Tahir as governor of his military services in order to assure his loyalty. Tahir and his family became entrenched in Iranian politics and became powerful, frustrating Al-Ma'mun's desire to centralize and strengthen Caliphal power. The rising power of the Tahirid family became a threat as Al-Ma'mun's own policies alienated them and other opponents.

Al-Ma'mun worked to centralize power and ensure a smooth succession. Al-Mahdi proclaimed that the caliph was the protector of Islam against heresy, and also claimed the ability to declare orthodoxy. Religious scholars averred that Al-Ma'mun was overstepping his bounds in the Mihna, the Abbasid inquisition which he introduced in 833 four months before he died. The Ulama emerged as a force in Islamic politics during Al-Ma'mun's reign for opposing the inquisitions. The Ulema and the major Islamic law schools took shape in the period of Al-Ma'mun. In parallel, Sunnism became defined as a religion of laws. Doctrinal differences between Sunni and Shi'a Islam became more pronounced.

During the Al-Ma'mun regime, border wars increased. Al-Ma'mun made preparations for a major campaign, but died while leading an expedition in Sardis. Al-Ma'mun gathered scholars of many religions at Baghdad, whom he treated well and with tolerance. He sent an emissary to the Byzantine Empire to collect the most famous manuscripts there, and had them translated into Arabic. His scientists originated alchemy. Shortly before his death, during a visit to Egypt in 832, the caliph ordered the breaching of the Great Pyramid of Giza to search for knowledge and treasure. Workers tunnelled in near where tradition located the original entrance. Al-Ma'mun later died near Tarsus under questionable circumstances and was succeeded by his half-brother, Al-Mu'tasim, rather than his son, Al-Abbas ibn Al-Ma'mun.

As Caliph, Al-Mu'tasim promptly ordered the dismantling of al-Ma'mun's military base at Tyana. He faced Khurramite revolts. One of the most difficult problems facing this Caliph was the ongoing uprising of Babak Khorramdin. Al-Mu'tasim overcame the rebels and secured a significant victory. Byzantine emperor Theophilus launched an attack against Abbasid fortresses. Al-Mu'tasim sent Al-Afshin, who met and defeated Theophilus' forces at the Battle of Anzen. On his return he became aware of a serious military conspiracy which forced him and his successors to rely upon Turkish commanders and ghilman slave-soldiers (foreshadowing the Mamluk system). The Khurramiyyah were never fully suppressed, although they slowly declined during the reigns of succeeding Caliphs. Near the end of al-Mu'tasim's life there was an uprising in Palestine, but he defeated the rebels.

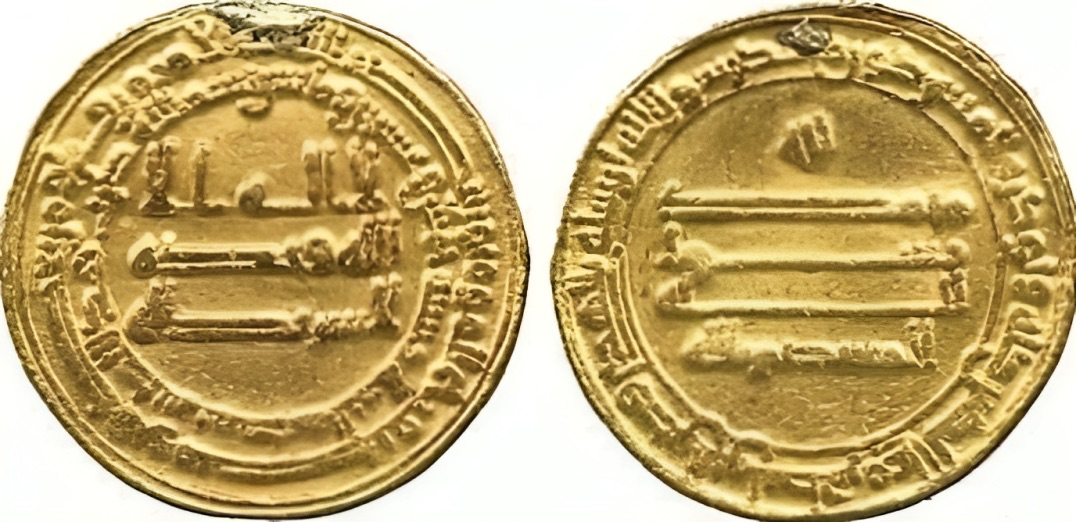
Gold dinar of Abbasid caliph al-Mu'tasim (r. 833–842) the founder of Samarra, patron of art and science

During Al-Mu'tasim's reign, the Tahirid family continued to grow in power. The Tahirids were exempted from many tribute and oversight functions. Their independence contributed to Abbasid decline in the east. Ideologically, al-Mu'tasim followed his half-brother al-Ma'mun. He continued his predecessor's support for the Islamic Mu'tazila sect, applying brutal torture against the opposition. Arab mathematician Al-Kindi was employed by Al-Mu'tasim and tutored the Caliph's son. Al-Kindi had served at the House of Wisdom and continued his studies in Greek geometry and algebra under the caliph's patronage.

Al-Wathiq succeeded his father. Al-Wathiq dealt with opposition in Arabia, Syria, Palestine and in Baghdad. Using a famous sword he personally joined the execution of the Baghdad rebels. The revolts were the result of an increasingly large gap between Arab populations and the Turkish armies. The revolts were put down, but antagonism between the two groups grew, as Turkish forces gained power. He also secured a captive exchange with the Byzantines. Al-Wathiq was a patron of scholars, as well as artists. He personally had musical talent and is reputed to have composed over one hundred songs.

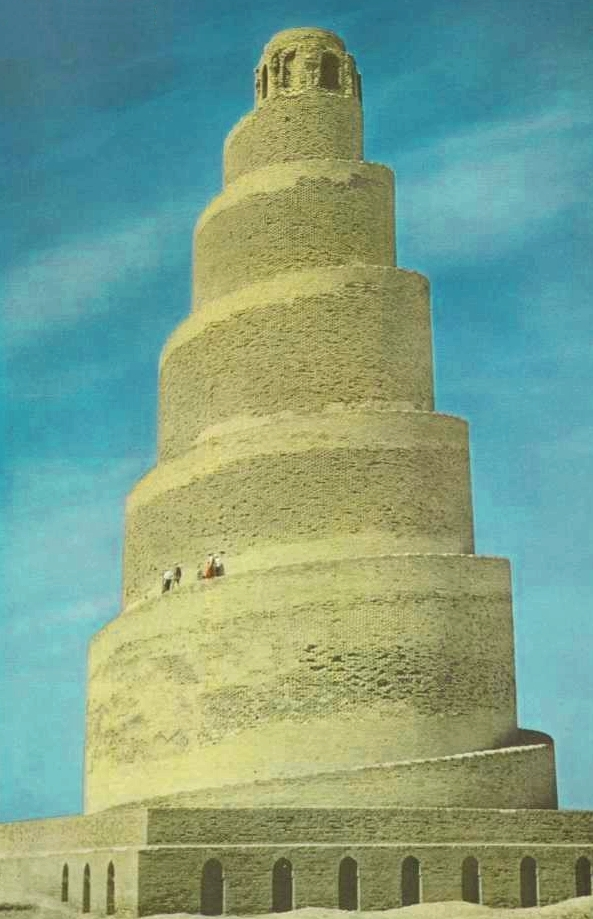
Minaret at the Great Mosque of Samarra.

When Al-Wathiq died of high fever, Al-Mutawakkil succeeded him. Al-Mutawakkil's reign is remembered for many reforms and is viewed as a golden age. He was the last great Abbasid caliph; after his death the dynasty fell into decline. Al-Mutawakkil ended the Mihna. Al-Mutawakkil built the Great Mosque of Samarra as part of an extension of Samarra eastwards. During his reign, Al-Mutawakkil met famous Byzantine theologian Constantine the Philosopher, who was sent to strengthen diplomatic relations between the Empire and the Caliphate by Emperor Michael III. Al-Mutawakkil involved himself in religious debates, as reflected in his actions against minorities. The Shīʻi faced repression embodied in the destruction of the shrine of Hussayn ibn ʻAlī, an action that was ostensibly carried out to stop pilgrimages. Al-Mutawakkil continued to rely on Turkish statesmen and slave soldiers to put down rebellions and lead battles against foreign empires, notably capturing Sicily from the Byzantines. Al-Mutawakkil was assassinated by a Turkish soldier.

Al-Muntasir succeeded to the Caliphate on the same day with the support of the Turkish faction, though he was implicated in the murder. The Turkish party had al-Muntasir remove his brothers from the line of succession, fearing revenge for the murder of their father. Both brothers wrote statements of abdication. During his reign, Al-Muntasir removed the ban on pilgrimage to the tombs of Hassan and Hussayn and sent Wasif to raid the Byzantines. Al-Muntasir died of unknown causes. The Turkish chiefs held a council to select his successor, electing Al-Musta'in. The Arabs and western troops from Baghdad were displeased at the choice and attacked. However, the Caliphate no longer depended on Arabian choice, but depended on Turkish support. After the failed Muslim campaign against the Christians, people blamed the Turks for bringing disaster on the faith and murdering their Caliphs. After the Turks besieged Baghdad, Al-Musta'in planned to abdicate to Al-Mu'tazz but was put to death by his order. Al-Mu'tazz was enthroned by the Turks, becoming the youngest Abbasid Caliph to assume power.

High Abbasids
Jurisprudence
Four constructions of Islamite law
- Abu Hanifa (Iraq teacher)
- Malik ibn Anas (Medina Imam)
- Muhammad ibn Idris ash-Shafi`i (Egyptian Imam)
- Ahmad ibn Hanbal (Baghdad teacher)
Early Abbasids
Literature and Science
- Hunayn ibn Ishaq, physician, Greek translator;
- Ibn Fadlan, explorer;
- Al Battani, astronomer;
- Tabari, historian and theologian;
- Al-Razi, philosopher, medic, chemist;
- Al-Farabi, chemist and philosopher;
- Abu Nasr Mansur, mathematician;
- Alhazen, mathematician;
- Al-Biruni, mathematician, astronomer, physicist;
- Omar Khayyám, poet, mathematician, and astronomer;
- Mansur Al-Hallaj, Sufism mystic, writer and teacher

Al-Mu'tazz proved too apt a pupil of his Turkish masters, but was surrounded by parties jealous of each other. At Samarra, the Turks were having problems with the "Westerns" (Berbers and Moors), while the Arabs and Persians at Baghdad, who had supported al-Musta'in, regarded both with equal hatred. Al-Mu'tazz put his brothers Al-Mu'eiyyad and Abu Ahmed to death. The ruler spent recklessly, causing a revolt of Turks, Africans, and Persians for their pay. Al-Mu'tazz was brutally deposed shortly thereafter. Al-Muhtadi became the next Caliph. He was firm and virtuous compared to the earlier Caliphs, though the Turks held the power. The Turks killed him soon after his ascension. Al-Mu'tamid followed, holding on for 23 years, though he was largely a ruler in name only. After the Zanj Rebellion, Al-Mu'tamid summoned al-Muwaffak to help him. Thereafter, Al-Muwaffaq ruled in all but name. The Hamdanid dynasty was founded by Hamdan ibn Hamdun when he was appointed governor of Mardin in Anatolia by the Caliphs in 890. Al-Mu'tamid later transferred authority to his son, al-Mu'tadid, and never regained power. The Tulunids became the first independent state in Islamic Egypt, when they broke away during this time.

Al-Mu'tadid ably administered the Caliphate. Egypt returned to allegiance and Mesopotamia was restored to order. He was tolerant towards Shi'i, but toward the Umayyad community he was not so just. Al-Mu'tadid was cruel in his punishments, some of which are not surpassed by those of his predecessors. For example, the Kharijite leader at Mosul was paraded about Baghdad clothed in a robe of silk, of which Kharijites denounced as sinful, and then crucified. Upon Al-Mu'tadid's death, his son by a Turkish slave-concubine, Al-Muktafi, succeeded to the throne.

Al-Muktafi became a favourite of the people for his generosity, and for abolishing his father's secret prisons, the terror of Baghdad. During his reign, the Caliphate overcame threats such as the Carmathians. Upon Al-Muktafi's death, the vazir next chose Al-Muqtadir. Al-Muqtadir's reign was a constant succession of thirteen Vazirs, one rising on the fall or assassination of another. His long reign brought the Empire to its lowest ebb. Africa was lost, and Egypt nearly. Mosul threw off its dependence, and the Greeks raided across the undefended border. The East continued to formally recognize the Caliphate, including those who virtually claimed independence.

At the end of the Early Baghdad Abbasids period, Empress Zoe Karbonopsina pressed for an armistice with Al-Muqtadir and arranged for the ransom of the Muslim prisoner while the Byzantine frontier was threatened by Bulgarians. This only added to Baghdad's disorder. Though despised by the people, Al-Muqtadir was again placed in power after upheavals. Al-Muqtadir was eventually slain outside the city gates, whereupon courtiers chose his brother al-Qahir. He was even worse. Refusing to abdicate, he was blinded and cast into prison.

His son al-Radi took over only to experience a cascade of misfortune. Praised for his piety, he became the tool of the de facto ruling Minister, Ibn Raik (amir al-umara; 'Amir of the Amirs'). Ibn Raik held the reins of government and his name was joined with the Caliph's in public prayers. Around this period, the Hanbalis, supported by popular sentiment, set up in fact a kind of 'Sunni inquisition'. Ar-Radi is commonly regarded as the last of the real Caliphs: the last to deliver orations at the Friday service, to hold assemblies, to commune with philosophers, to discuss the questions of the day, to take counsel on the affairs of State; to distribute alms, or to temper the severity of cruel officers. Thus ended the Early Baghdad Abbasids.

In the late mid-930s, the Ikhshidids of Egypt carried the Arabic title "Wali" reflecting their position as governors on behalf of the Abbasids, The first governor (Muhammad bin Tughj Al-Ikhshid) was installed by the Abbasid Caliph. They gave him and his descendants the Wilayah for 30 years. The last name Ikhshid is Soghdian for "prince".

Also in the 930s, 'Alī ibn Būyah and his two younger brothers, al-Hassan and Aḥmad founded the Būyid confederation. Originally a soldier in the service of the Ziyārīds of Ṭabaristān, 'Alī was able to recruit an army to defeat a Turkish general from Baghdad named Yāqūt in 934. Over the next nine years the three brothers gained control of the remainder of the caliphate, while accepting the titular authority of the caliph in Baghdad. The Būyids made large territorial gains. Fars and Jibal were conquered. Central Iraq submitted in 945, before the Būyids took Kermān (967), Oman (967), the Jazīra (979), Ṭabaristān (980), and Gorgan (981). After this the Būyids went into slow decline, with pieces of the confederation gradually breaking off and local dynasties under their rule becoming de facto independent.

=== Middle Baghdad Abbasids ===
Early High Middle Ages

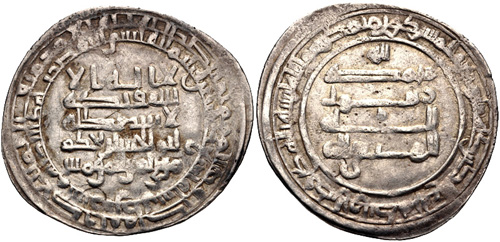
Dirham of Al-Muttaqi

At the beginning of the Middle Baghdad Abbasids, the Caliphate had become of little importance. The amir al-umara Bajkam contented himself with dispatching his secretary to Baghdad to assemble local dignitaries to elect a successor. The choice fell on Al-Muttaqi. Bajkam was killed on a hunting party by marauding Kurds. In the ensuing anarchy in Baghdad, Ibn Raik persuaded the Caliph to flee to Mosul where he was welcomed by the Hamdanids. They assassinated Ibn Raik. Hamdanid Nasir al-Dawla advanced on Baghdad, where mercenaries and well-organised Turks repelled them. Turkish general Tuzun became amir al-umara. The Turks were staunch Sunnis. A fresh conspiracy placed the Caliph in danger. Hamdanid troops helped ad-Daula escape to Mosul and then to Nasibin. Tuzun and the Hamdanid were stalemated. Al-Muttaqi was at Raqqa, moving to Tuzun where he was deposed. Tuzun installed the blinded Caliph's cousin as successor, with the title of Al-Mustakfi. With the new Caliph, Tuzun attacked the Buwayhid dynasty and the Hamdanids. Soon after, Tuzun died, and was succeeded by one of his generals, Abu Ja'far. The Buwayhids then attacked Baghdad, and Abu Ja'far fled into hiding with the Caliph. Buwayhid Sultan Muiz ud-Daula assumed command forcing the Caliph into abject submission to the Amir. Eventually, Al-Mustakfi was blinded and deposed. The city fell into chaos, and the Caliph's palace was looted.

Significant Middle Abbasid Muslims
- Ibn Rushd (Averroes), philosopher;
- al-Farabi, Persian (Soghdian) philosopher;
- Al-Mutanebbi, Arabic poet;
- Abu Ali Husain ibn Abdallah ibn Sina (Avicenna), physician, philosopher, and scientist

Once the Buwayhids controlled Baghdad, Al-Muti became caliph. The office was shorn of real power and Shi'a observances were established. The Buwayhids held on Baghdad for over a century. Throughout the Buwayhid reign the Caliphate was at its lowest ebb, but was recognized religiously, except in Iberia. Buwayhid Sultan Mu'izz al-Dawla was prevented from raising a Shi'a Caliph to the throne by fear for his own safety, and fear of rebellion, in the capital and beyond.

The next Caliph, Al-Ta'i, reigned over factional strife in Syria among the Fatimids, Turks, and Carmathians. The Hideaway dynasty also fractured. The Abbasid borders were the defended only by small border states. Baha' al-Dawla, the Buyid amir of Iraq, deposed al-Ta'i in 991 and proclaimed al-Qadir the new caliph.

During al-Qadir's Caliphate, Mahmud of Ghazni looked after the empire. Mahmud of Ghazni, of Eastern fame, was friendly towards the Caliphs, and his victories in the Indian Empire were accordingly announced from the pulpits of Baghdad in grateful and glowing terms. Al-Qadir fostered the Sunni struggle against Shiʿism and outlawed heresies such as the Baghdad Manifesto and the doctrine that the Quran was created. He outlawed the Muʿtazila, bringing an end to the development of rationalist Muslim philosophy. During this and the next period, Islamic literature, especially Persian literature, flourished under the patronage of the Buwayhids. By 1000, the global Muslim population had climbed to about 4 percent of the world, compared to the Christian population of 10 percent.

During Al-Qa'im's reign, the Buwayhid ruler often fled the capital and the Seljuq dynasty gained power. Toghrül overran Syria and Armenia. He then made his way into the Capital, where he was well-received both by chiefs and people. In Bahrain, the Qarmatian state collapsed in Al-Hasa. Arabia recovered from the Fatimids and again acknowledged the spiritual jurisdiction of the Abbasids. Al-Muqtadi was honoured by the Seljuq Sultan Malik-Shah I, during whose reign the Caliphate was recognized throughout the extending range of Seljuq conquest. The Sultan was critical of the Caliph's interference in affairs of state, but died before deposing the last of the Middle Baghdad Abbasids.

=== Late Baghdad Abbasids ===
Late High Middle Ages

Al-Aqsa Mosque

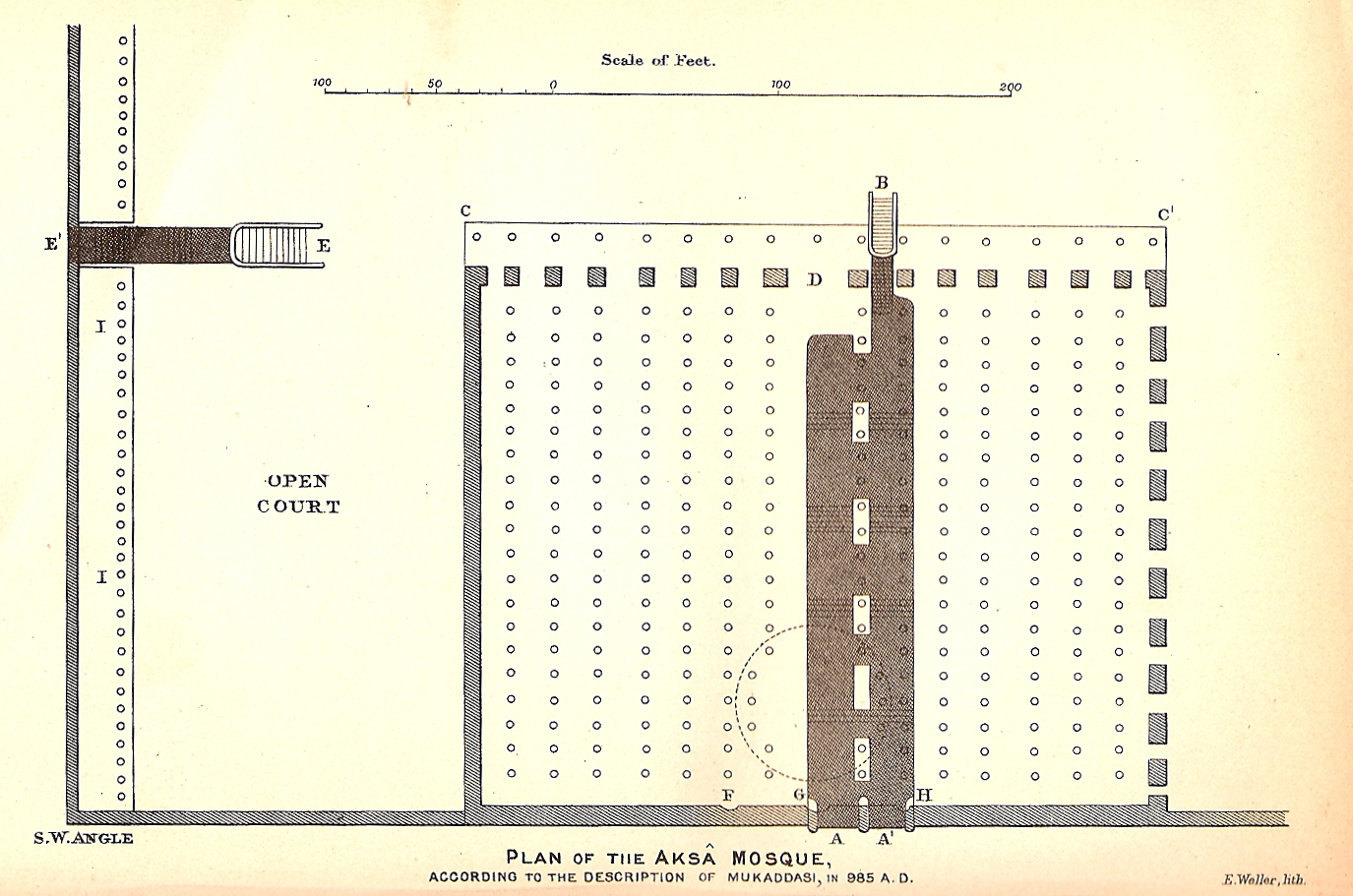
Plan of Al-Aqsa Mosque, year 985

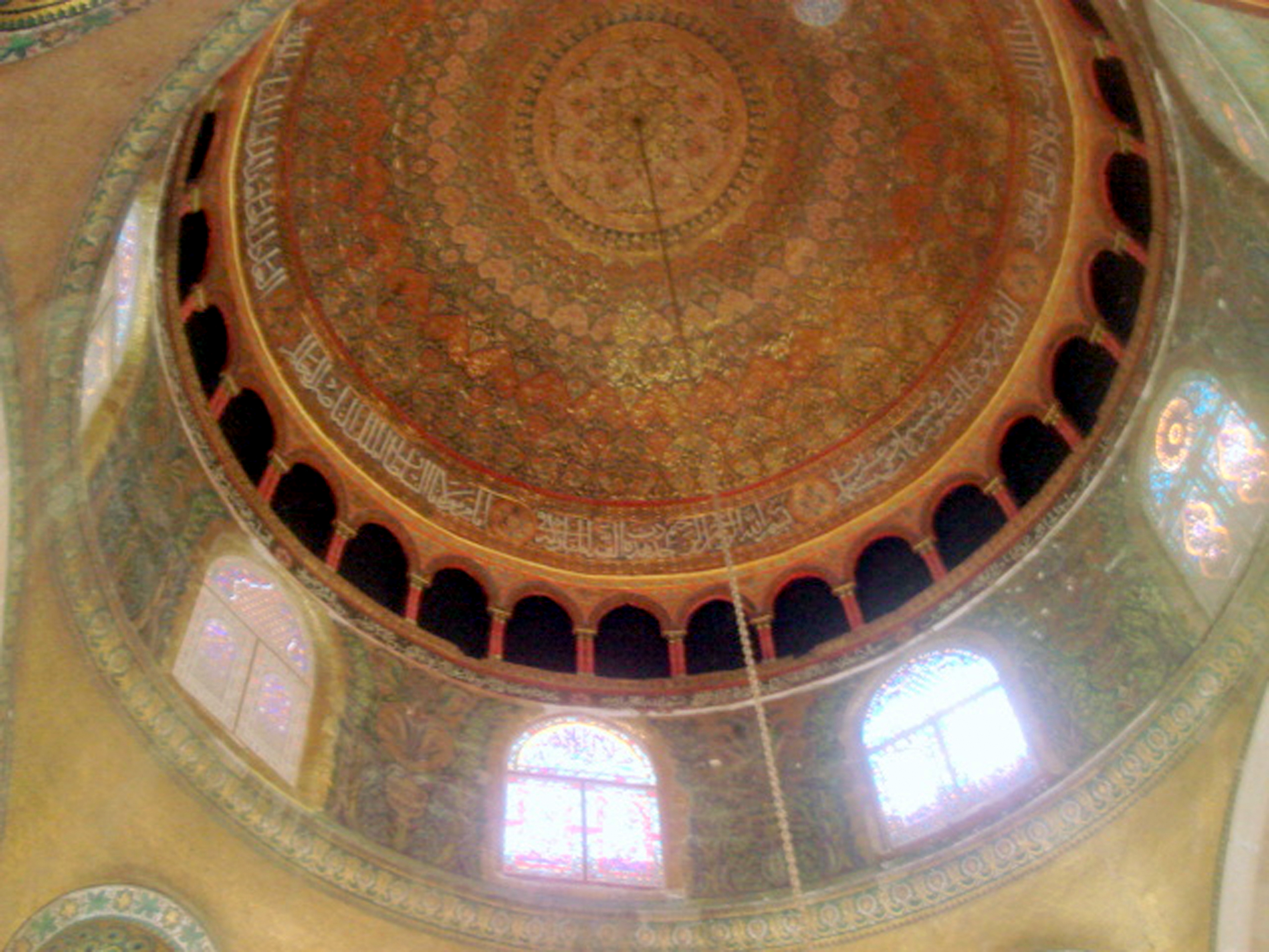
Dome of Al Aqsa Mosque

The Late Baghdad Abbasids reigned from the beginning of the Crusades to the Seventh Crusade. The first Caliph was Al-Mustazhir. He was politically irrelevant, despite civil strife at home and the First Crusade in Syria. Raymond IV of Toulouse attempted to attack Baghdad, losing at the Battle of Manzikert. The global Muslim population climbed to about 5 per cent as against the Christian population of 11 per cent by 1100. Jerusalem was captured by crusaders who massacred its inhabitants. Preachers travelled throughout the caliphate proclaiming the tragedy and rousing men to recover the Al-Aqsa Mosque compound from the Franks (European Crusaders). Crowds of exiles rallied for war against the infidel. Neither the Sultan nor the Caliph sent an army west.

Al-Mustarshid achieved more independence while the sultan Mahmud II of Great Seljuq was engaged in war in the East. The Banu Mazyad (Mazyadid State) general, Dubays ibn Sadaqa (emir of Al-Hilla), plundered Bosra and attacked Baghdad together with a young brother of the sultan, Ghiyath ad-Din Mas'ud. Dubays was crushed by a Seljuq army under Zengi, founder of the Zengid dynasty. Mahmud's death was followed by a civil war between his son Dawud, his nephew Mas'ud and the atabeg Toghrul II. Zengi was recalled to the East, stimulated by the Caliph and Dubays, where he was beaten. The Caliph then laid siege to Mosul for three months without success, resisted by Mas'ud and Zengi. It was nonetheless a milestone in the caliphate's military revival.

After the siege of Damascus (1134), Zengi undertook operations in Syria. Al-Mustarshid attacked sultan Mas'ud of western Seljuq and was taken prisoner. He was later found murdered. His son, Al-Rashid failed to gain independence from Seljuq Turks. Zengi, because of the murder of Dubays, set up a rival Sultanate. Mas'ud attacked; the Caliph and Zengi, hopeless of success, escaped to Mosul. The Sultan regained power, a council was held, the Caliph was deposed, and his uncle, son of Al-Muqtafi, appointed as the new Caliph. Ar-Rashid fled to Isfahan and was killed by Hashshashins.

Continued disunion and contests between Seljuq Turks allowed al-Muqtafi to maintain control in Baghdad and to extend it throughout Iraq. In 1139, al-Muqtafi granted protection to Patriarch Abdisho III of the Church of the East. While the Crusade raged, the Caliph successfully defended Baghdad against Muhammad II of Seljuq in the Siege of Baghdad (1157). The Sultan and the Caliph dispatched men in response to Zengi's appeal, but neither the Seljuqs, nor the Caliph, nor their Amirs, dared resist the Crusaders.

The next caliph, Al-Mustanjid, saw Saladin extinguish the Fatimid dynasty after 260 years, and thus the Abbasids again prevailed. Al-Mustadi reigned when Saladin became the sultan of Egypt and declared allegiance to the Abbasids.

An-Nasir, "The Victor for the Religion of God", attempted to restore the Caliphate to its ancient dominant role. He consistently held Iraq from Tikrit to the Gulf without interruption. His forty-seven-year reign was chiefly marked by ambitious and corrupt dealings with the Tartar chiefs, and by his hazardous invocation of the Mongols, which ended his dynasty. His son, Az-Zahir, was Caliph for a short period before his death and An-Nasir's grandson, Al-Mustansir, was made caliph.

Al-Mustansir founded the Mustansiriya Madrasah. In 1236 Ögedei Khan commanded to raise up Khorassan and populated Herat. The Mongol military governors mostly made their camp in Mughan plain, Azerbaijan. The rulers of Mosul and Cilician Armenia surrendered. Chormaqan divided the South Caucasus region into three districts based on military hierarchy. In Georgia, the population were temporarily divided into eight tumens. By 1237 the Mongol Empire had subjugated most of Persia, excluding Abbasid Iraq and Ismaili strongholds, and all of Afghanistan and Kashmir.

Al-Musta'sim was the last Abbasid Caliph in Baghdad and is noted for his opposition to the rise of Shajar al-Durr to the Egyptian throne during the Seventh Crusade. To the east, Mongol forces under Hulagu Khan swept through the Transoxiana and Khorasan. Baghdad was sacked and the caliph deposed soon afterwards. The Mamluk sultans and Syria later appointed a powerless Abbasid Caliph in Cairo.

=== Caliph of Cairo (1261–1517) ===
The "shadow" caliph of Cairo
Late Middle Ages

The Abbasid "shadow" caliph of Cairo reigned under the tutelage of the Mamluk sultans and nominal rulers used to legitimize the actual rule of the Mamluk sultans. All the Cairene Abbasid caliphs who preceded or succeeded Al-Musta'in were spiritual heads lacking any temporal power. Al-Musta'in was the only Cairo-based Abbasid caliph to even briefly hold political power. Al-Mutawakkil III was the last "shadow" caliph. In 1517, Ottoman sultan Selim I defeated the Mamluk Sultanate, and made Egypt part of the Ottoman Empire.

== Fatimid Caliphate ==
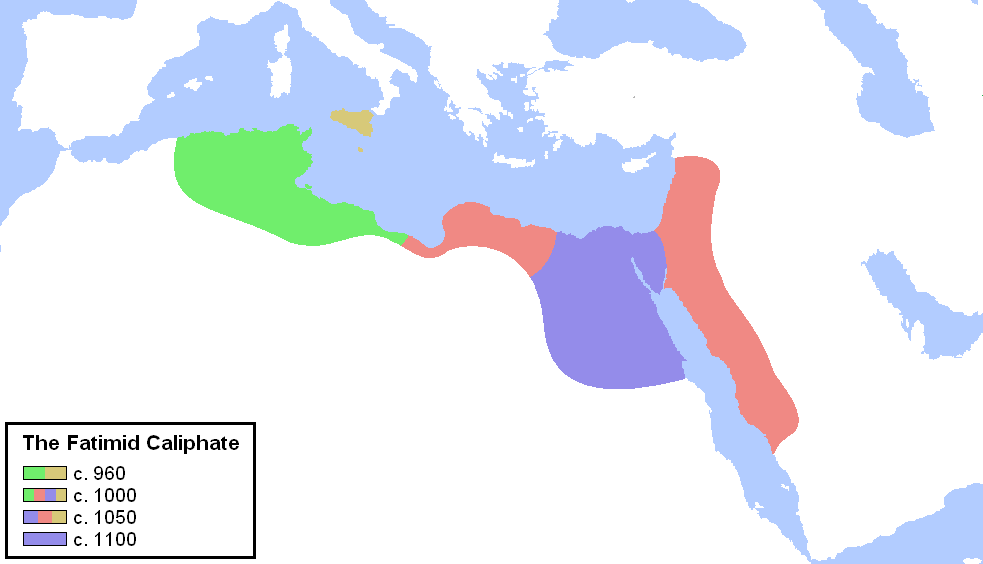
Fatimid Caliphate in 1000

The Fatimids originated in Ifriqiya (modern-day Tunisia and eastern Algeria). The dynasty was founded in 909 by ʻAbdullāh al-Mahdī Billah, who legitimized his claim through descent from Muhammad by way of his daughter Fātima as-Zahra and her husband ʻAlī ibn-Abī-Tālib, the first Shīʻa Imām, hence the name al-Fātimiyyūn "Fatimid". Abdullāh al-Mahdi's control soon extended over all of central Maghreb and Egypt. The Fatimids and the Zaydis at the time, used the Hanafi jurisprudence, as did most Sunnis.

Unlike other governments in the area, Fatimid advancement in state offices was based more on merit than heredity. Members of other branches of Islam, including Sunnis, were just as likely to be appointed to government posts as Shiites. Tolerance covered non-Muslims such as Christians and Jews; they took high levels in government based on ability. There were, however, exceptions to this general attitude of tolerance, notably Al-Hakim bi-Amr Allah.

The Fatimid palace was in two parts. It was in the Khan el-Khalili area at Bin El-Quasryn street.

=== Fatimid caliphs ===
Early and High Middle Ages

Also see: Cairo Abbasid Caliphs (above)

During the beginning of the Middle Baghdad Abbasids, the Fatimid Caliphs claimed spiritual supremacy not only in Egypt, but also contested the religious leadership of Syria. At the beginning of the Abbasid realm in Baghdad, the Alids faced severe persecution by the ruling party as they were a direct threat to the Caliphate. Owing to the Abbasid inquisitions, the forefathers opted for concealment of the Dawa's existence. Subsequently, they travelled towards the Iranian Plateau and distanced themselves from the epicenter of the political world. Al Mahdi's father, Al Husain al Mastoor returned to control the Dawa's affairs. He sent two Dai's to Yemen and Western Africa. Al Husain died soon after the birth of his son, Al Mahdi. A system of government helped update Al Mahdi on the development which took place in North Africa.

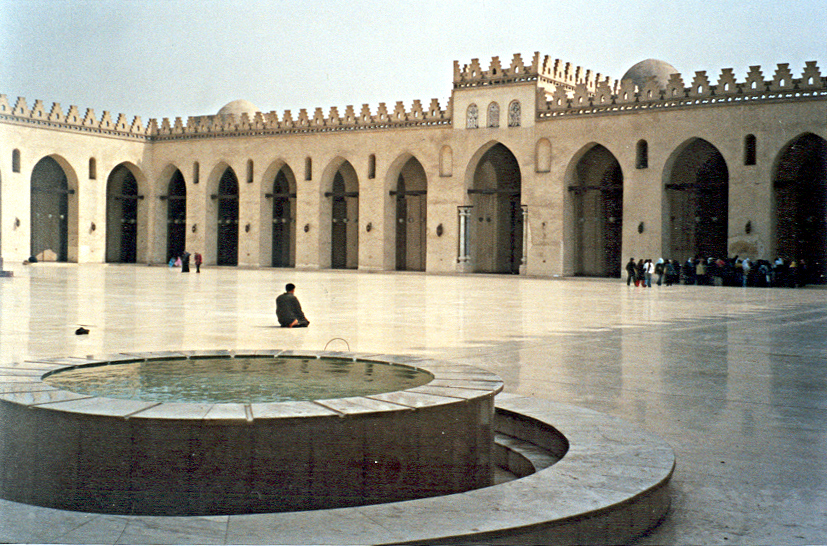
The Al-Hakim Mosque Cairo, Egypt; south of Bab Al-Futuh "Islamic Cairo" building was named after Al-Hakim bi-Amr Allah, built by Fatimid vizier Gawhar Al-Siqilli, and extended by Badr al-Jamali.

Al Mahdi Abdullah al-Mahdi Billah established the first Imam of the Fatimid dynasty. He claimed genealogic origins dating as far back as Fatimah through Husayn and Ismail. Al Mahdi established his headquarters at Salamiyah and moved towards north-western Africa, under Aghlabid rule. His success of laying claim to being the precursor to the Mahdi was instrumental among the Berber tribes of North Africa, specifically the Kutamah tribe. Al Mahdi established himself at the former Aghlabid residence at Raqqadah, a suburb of Al-Qayrawan in Tunisia. In 920, Al Mahdi took up residence at the newly established capital of the empire, Al-Mahdiyyah. After his death, Al Mahdi was succeeded by his son, Abu Al-Qasim Muhammad Al-Qaim, who continued his expansionist policy. At the time of his death he had extended his reign to Morocco of the Idrisids, as well as Egypt itself. The Fatimid Caliphate grew to include Sicily and to stretch across North Africa from the Atlantic Ocean to Libya. Abdullāh al-Mahdi's control soon extended over all of central Maghreb, an area consisting of the modern countries of Morocco, Algeria, Tunisia, and Libya, which he ruled from Mahdia, in Tunisia. Newly built capital Al-Mansuriya, (Note: The name Mansuriyya means "the victorious", after its founder Ismāʿīl Abu Tahir Ismail Billah, called al-Mansur, "the victor.") or Mansuriyya (Arabic: المنصوريه), near Kairouan, Tunisia, was the capital of the Fatimid Caliphate during the rules of the Imams Al-Mansur Billah (r. 946–953) and Al-Mu'izz li-Din Allah (r. 953–975).

The Fatimid general Jawhar conquered Egypt in 969, and he built a new palace city there, near Fusṭāt, which he also called al-Manṣūriyya. Under Al-Muizz Lideenillah, the Fatimids conquered the Ikhshidid Wilayah (see Fatimid Egypt), founding a new capital at al-Qāhira (Cairo) in 969. The name was a reference to the planet Mars, "The Subduer", which was prominent in the sky at the moment that city construction started. Cairo was intended as a royal enclosure for the Fatimid caliph and his army, though the actual administrative and economic capital of Egypt was in cities such as Fustat until 1169. After Egypt, the Fatimids continued to conquer the surrounding areas until they ruled from Tunisia to Syria, as well as Sicily.

Under the Fatimids, Egypt became the center of an empire that included at its peak North Africa, Sicily, Palestine, Jordan, Lebanon, Syria, the Red Sea coast of Africa, Tihamah, Hejaz, and Yemen. Egypt flourished, and the Fatimids developed an extensive trade network in both the Mediterranean and the Indian Ocean. Their trade and diplomatic ties extended all the way to China and its Song dynasty, which eventually determined the economic course of Egypt during the High Middle Ages.

After the eighteenth Imam, al-Mustansir Billah, the Nizari sect believed that his son Nizar was his successor, while another Ismāʿīlī branch known as the Mustaali (from whom the Dawoodi Bohra would eventually descend), supported his other son, al-Musta'li. The Fatimid dynasty continued with al-Musta'li as both Imam and Caliph, and that joint position held until the 20th Imam, al-Amir bi-Ahkami l-Lah (1132). At the death of Imam Amir, one branch of the Mustaali faith claimed that he had transferred the imamate to his son at-Tayyib Abi l-Qasim, who was then two years old. After the decay of the Fatimid political system in the 1160s, the Zengid ruler Nūr ad-Dīn had his general, Shirkuh, seize Egypt from the vizier Shawar in 1169. Shirkuh died two months after taking power, and the rule went to his nephew, Saladin. This began the Ayyubid Sultanate of Egypt and Syria.

== Crusades ==
Beginning in the 8th century, the Iberian Christian kingdoms had begun the Reconquista aimed at retaking Al-Andalus from the Moors. In 1095, Pope Urban II, inspired by the conquests in Spain by Christian forces and implored by the eastern Roman emperor to help defend Christianity in the East, called for the First Crusade from Western Europe which captured Edessa, Antioch, County of Tripoli and Jerusalem.

In the early period of the Crusades, the Christian Kingdom of Jerusalem emerged and for a time controlled Jerusalem. The Kingdom of Jerusalem and other smaller Crusader kingdoms over the next 90 years formed part of the complicated politics of the Levant, but did not threaten the Islamic Caliphate nor other powers in the region. After Shirkuh ended Fatimid rule in 1169, uniting it with Syria, the Crusader kingdoms were faced with a threat, and his nephew Saladin reconquered most of the area in 1187, leaving the Crusaders holding a few ports.

In the Third Crusade armies from Europe failed to recapture Jerusalem, though Crusader states lingered for several decades, and other crusades followed. The Christian Reconquista continued in Al-Andalus, and was eventually completed with the fall of Granada in 1492. During the low period of the Crusades, the Fourth Crusade was diverted from the Levant and instead took Constantinople, leaving the Eastern Roman Empire (now the Byzantine Empire) further weakened in their long struggle against the Turkish peoples to the east. However, the crusaders did manage to damage Islamic caliphates; according to William of Malmesbury, preventing them from further expansion into Christendom and being targets of the Mamluks and the Mongols.

== Ayyubid dynasty ==
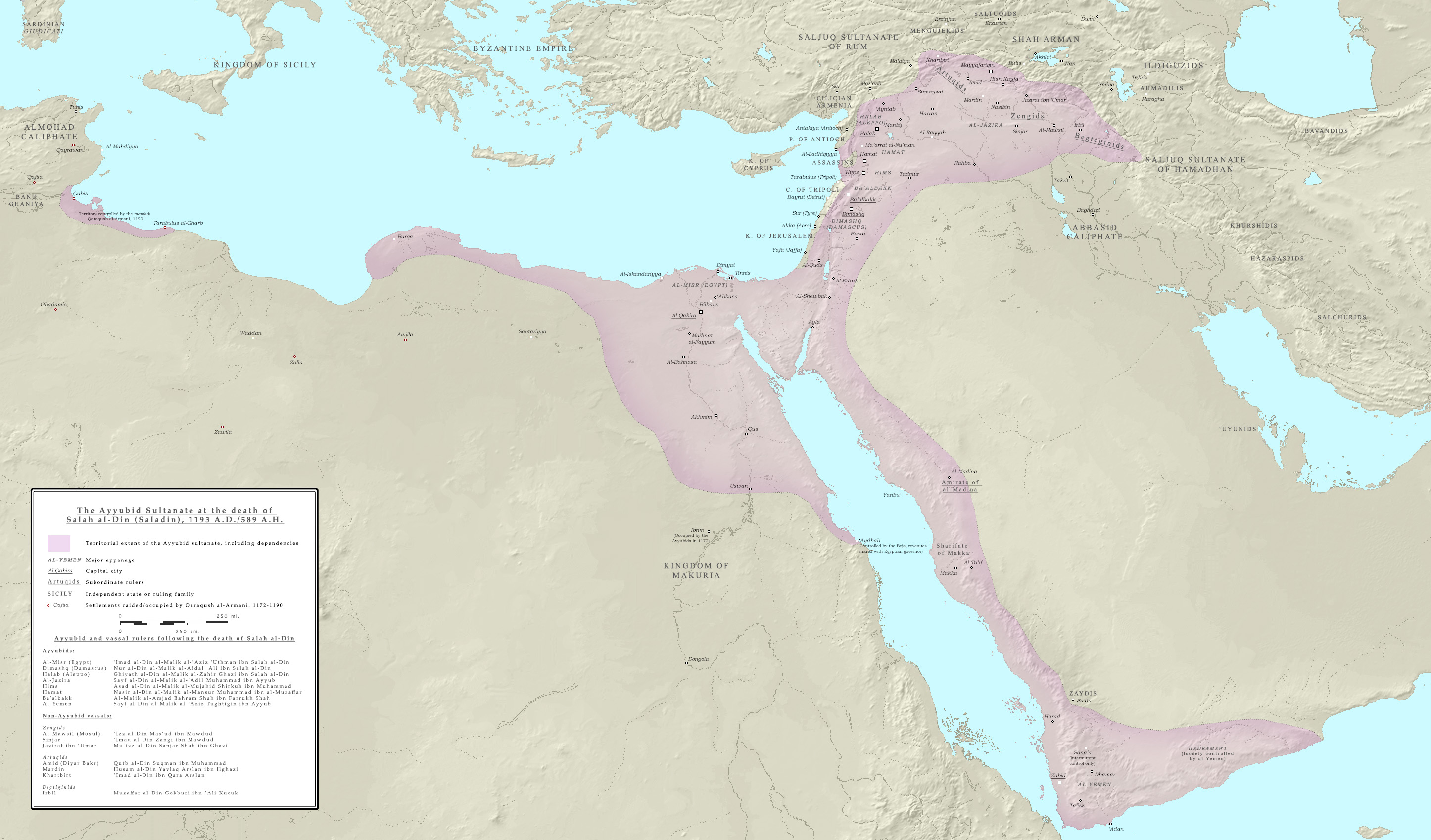
Ayyubid empire

The Ayyubid dynasty was founded by Saladin and centered in Egypt. In 1174, Saladin proclaimed himself Sultan and conquered the Near East region. The Ayyubids ruled much of the Middle East during the 12th and 13th centuries, controlling Egypt, Syria, northern Mesopotamia, Hejaz, Yemen, and the North African coast up to the borders of modern-day Tunisia. After Saladin, his sons contested control over the sultanate, but Saladin's brother al-Adil eventually established himself in 1200. In the 1230s, Syria's Ayyubid rulers attempted to win independence from Egypt and remained divided until Egyptian Sultan as-Salih Ayyub restored Ayyubid unity by taking over most of Syria, excluding Aleppo, by 1247. In 1250, the dynasty in the Egyptian region was overthrown by slave regiments. A number of attempts to recover it failed, led by an-Nasir Yusuf of Aleppo. In 1260, the Mongols sacked Aleppo and wrested control of what remained of the Ayyubid territories soon after.

== Turco-Mongol conversion ==
=== Mongol period ===
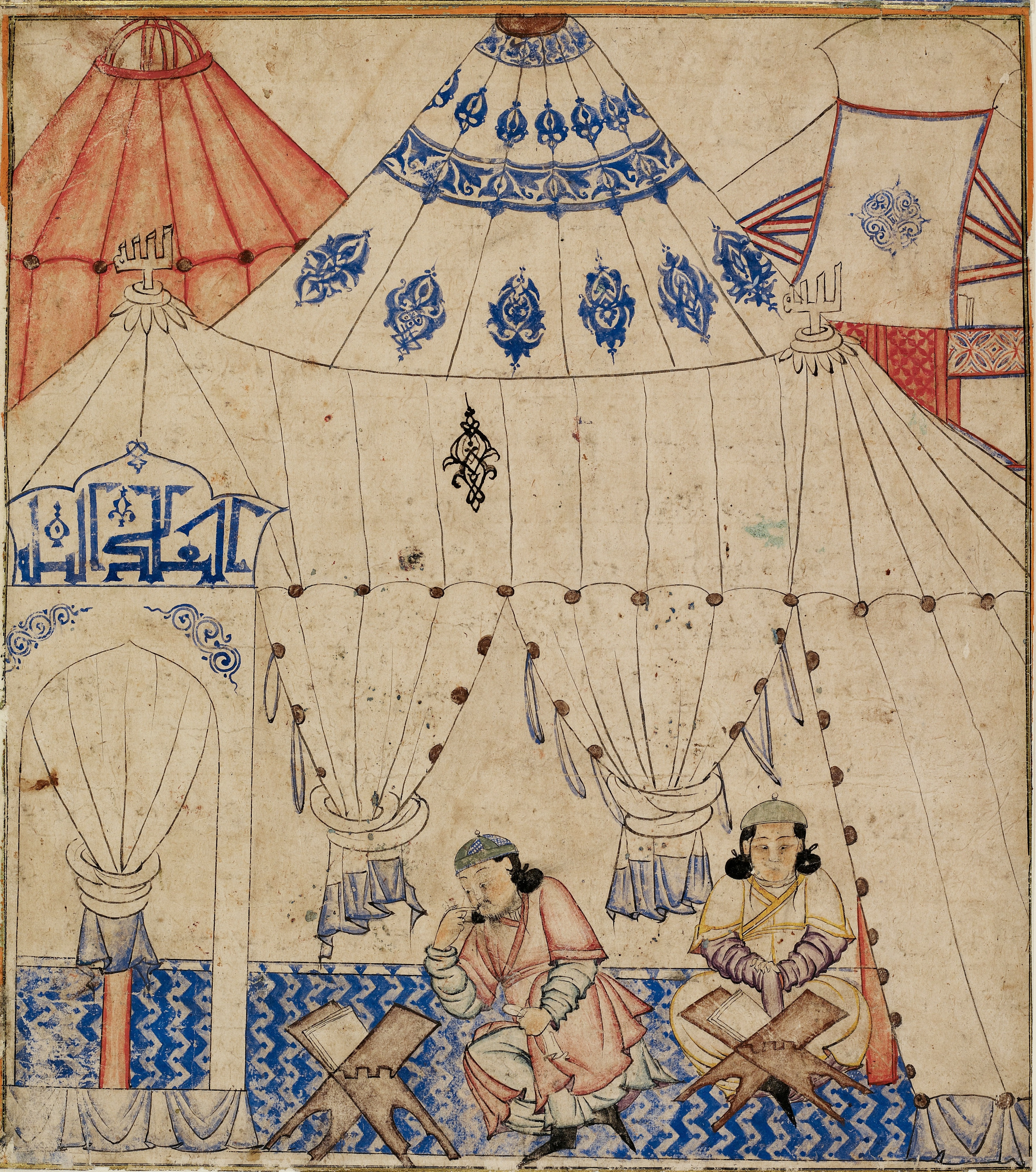
The Mongol ruler, Ghazan, depicted studying the Quran inside a tent. Illustration of Rashīd ad-Dīn, first quarter of the 14th century, Staatsbibliothek, Berlin.

While the Abbasid Caliphate suffered a decline following the reign of al-Wathiq (842–847) and al-Mu'tadid (892–902), the Mongol Empire put an end to the Abbasid dynasty in 1258. The Mongols spread throughout Central Asia and Persia; the Persian city of Isfahan had fallen to them by 1237.

The Ilkhans of Chingisid descendence understood themselves as defenders of Islam, perhaps even as the legitimate heirs of the Abbasid Caliphate. Al-Nuwayri, stated that the Mongols had heavenly approval and would live in accordance with the restrictions of Islamic law. Some Sufi Muslim writers, such as the Persian poet and mystic Jalāl ad-Dīn Muhammad Rūmī and his biographer Šams al-Dīn Aḥmad Aflākī, regarded the Mongols and Turkic peoples from the Eurasian Steppe as more pious than the Muslim scholars, ascetics, and muftis of their time, and hence expressed favor of their conquests, considering the invasion as divine punishment from God. Aflaki identifies the invasion with a hadith, describing the Turks (and Mongols) as the army of Muhammad's wrath. In his Manaqib al-'Arifin, the Turks and Mongols are described as God's "punishment from hell", and by that, people who follow the will of the Creator.

Many scholars had argued that the conversion of the Turks and Mongols has been filtered through the mediation of Persian and Central Asian culture. Rather than converting to Islamic orthodoxy, they encountered Islam mostly through the preaching of Sufi Muslim wandering ascetics and mystics (fakirs and dervishes). Recently this view has been challenged on grounds that a defined Islamic orthodoxy has not yet existed during the conversion of the Turks and Mongols.

In the 13th to the 14th centuries, both Sunnī and Shīʿa practices were intertwined, and historical figures commonly associated with the history of Shīʿa Islam, like ʿAlī ibn Abī Ṭālib and Jaʿfar al-Ṣādiq (respectively, the first and sixth Shīʿīte Imams), played an almost universal role for Muslim believers to understand "the Unseen" (al-Ghaib). A sharp distinction between Sunnī, Shīʿa, and heterodox Islamic beliefs did not exist. Therefore, ideas from foreign cultures were easier to integrate into the Islamic worldview. During this era, the Persian Sufi poet and mystic Jalaluddin Rumi (1207–1273) wrote his masterpiece, the Masnavi, which he believed to be "sent down" from God and understood it as the proper explanation of the Quran (tafsīr). According to Aflaki, the invading Mongols were impressed by Rumi's devotion to God, so they did not assault him, believing it would cause the wrath of God upon them.

On the other hand, Turks and Mongols also faced criticism. Opposition to them have been formulated by Ibn Taymiyya (1263–1328), who did not accept the Mongols' conversion to Sunnism. Feeling threatened by the Crusaders and the Mongols, ibn Taymiyya called for elimination by a militant jihād against whom he deemed "heretic", including Shias, al-Ashʿariyya and falāsifa (philosophers), and established his own theological doctrines. His theology was characterized by a literal understanding of the Quran, a physicalist ontology, and a rejection of most philosophical and mystical approaches in favor of a simplistic and dogmatic theology.

Another unique characteristic of his theological approach was the importance of a theocratic state. Prior to ibn Taimiyya, religious wisdom was meant to guide governmental authorities, while ibn Taymiyya demanded political power to promote religious piety. Having a deep-rooting discern for the Mongols, ibn Taimiyya sought to pronounce takfīr (excommunication) upon the Turco-Mongol rulers, despite their profession of the shahada (Islamic testimony of faith), or regular observance of aṣ-Ṣalāh (obligatory prayers), sawm (fasting) and other expressions of religiosity. His disciple ibn Kathir ( d. 1373), propounded the same belief in his tafsīr.

During his lifetime, ibn Taimiyya played only a marginal role and most of his writings were rejected. He was repeatedly accused of blasphemy by anthropomorphizing God, and his disciple Ibn Kathir distanced himself from his mentor. Yet, some of Ibn Taymiyya's teaching influenced Ibn Kathir's methodology on tafsīr, discounted much of the exegetical tradition since then. Only centuries later, among Wahhabis and in 21st century Salafism, their writings gained notable importance.

=== Islamic Mongol empires ===
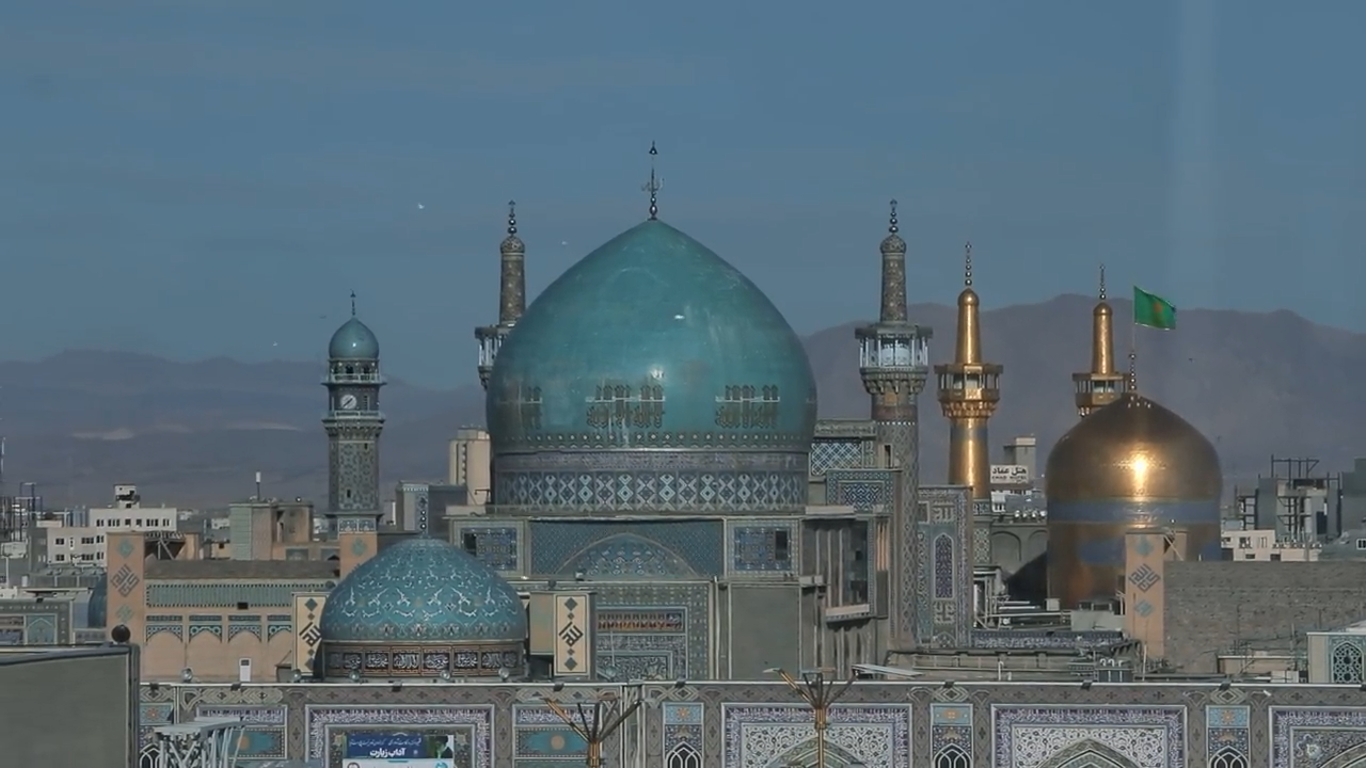
The Goharshad Mosque within the Imam Reza Shrine in Mashhad, Iran, built by the Timurid Empire in 1418.

Ultimately, the Ilkhanate, Golden Horde, and the Chagatai Khanate – three of the four principal Mongol khanates – embraced Islam. In power in Syria, Mesopotamia, Persia, and further east, over the rest of the 13th century gradually all converted to Islam. Most Ilkhanid rulers were replaced by the new Mongol power founded by Timur (himself a Muslim), who conquered Persia in the 1360s, and moved against the Delhi Sultanate in India and the Ottoman Turks in Anatolia. Timur's ceaseless conquests were accompanied by displays of brutality matched only by Chinggis Khan, whose example Timur consciously imitated. Samarqand, the cosmopolitan capital of Timur's empire, flourished under his rule as never before, while Iran and Iraq suffered large-scale devastation. Muslim scholars, such as Nasir al-Din al-Tusi and Qutb al-Din al-Shirazi, studied in the Maragheh observatory, erected by Hulegu Khan.

The Middle East was still recovering from the Black Death, which may have killed one third of the population in the region. The plague began in China, and reached Alexandria in Egypt in 1347, spreading over the following years to most Islamic areas. The combination of the plague and the wars left the Middle Eastern Islamic world in a seriously weakened position. The Timurid dynasty would found many strong empires of Islam, including the Mughals of India.

=== Timurid Renaissance ===
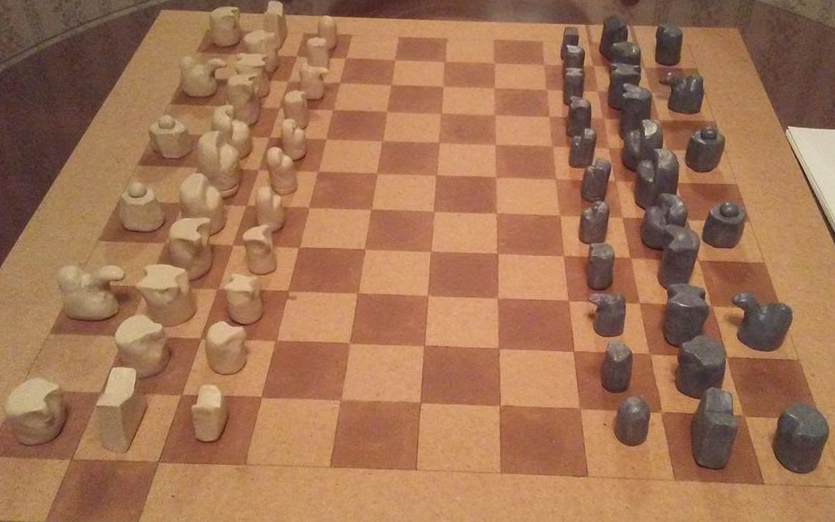
Tamerlane chess, invented by Amir Timur. The pieces approximate the appearance of the chess pieces in 14th century Iran.

The Timurid Empire based in Central Asia ruled by the Timurid dynasty saw a tremendous increase in the fields of arts and sciences, spreading across both the eastern and western world.

Remarkable was the invention of Tamerlane Chess, reconstruction of the city of Samarkand, and substantial contributions made by the family of Sultan Shah Rukh, which includes Gawhar Shad, polymath Ulugh Begh, and Sultan Husayn Bayqara in the fields of astronomy, mathematics, and architecture. The empire received widespread support from multiple Islamic scholars and scientists. A number of Islamic learning centres and mosques were built, most notably the Ulugh Beg Observatory.

The prosperity of the city of Herat is said to have competed with those of Florence, the birthplace of the Italian Renaissance as the center of a cultural rebirth.

The aspects of the Timurid Renaissance were later brought in Mughal India by the Mughal Emperors and served as a heritage of states of the other remaining Islamic Gunpowder empires: the Ottoman Empire and the Safavid Iran.

=== Mamluk Sultanate ===
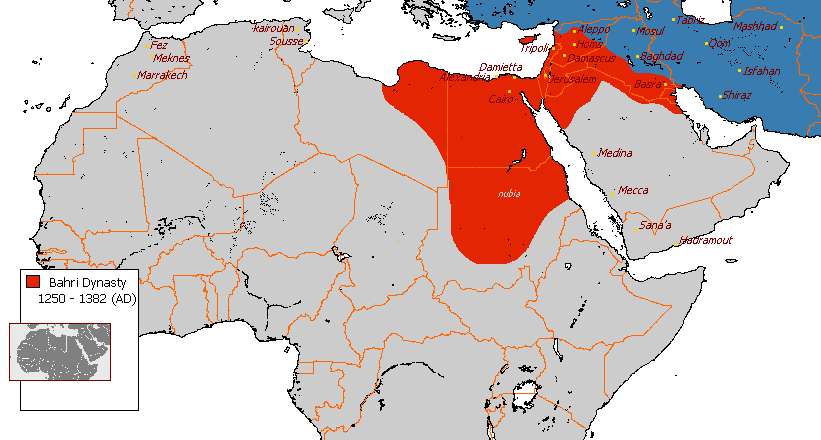
Map of the Mamluk Sultanate (in red) and the Mongol Ilkhanate (in blue) (1250–1382)

In 1250, the Ayyubid dynasty was overthrown by slave regiments, and the Mamluk Sultanate was born. Military prestige was at the center of Mamluk society, and it played a key role in the confrontations with the Mongol Empire during the Mongol invasions of the Levant.

In the 1260s, the Mongols sacked and controlled the Islamic Near East territories. The Mongol invaders were finally stopped by Egyptian Mamluks and their local allies north of Jerusalem in 1260 at the pivotal Battle of Ain Jalut. The Mamluks, who were slave-soldiers predominantly of Turkic, Caucasian, and Southeastern European origins (see Saqaliba), forced out the Mongols (see Battle of Ain Jalut) after the final destruction of the Ayyubid dynasty. The Mongols were again defeated by the Mamluks at the Battle of Hims a few months later, and then driven out of Syria altogether. With this, the Mamluks were able to concentrate their forces and to conquer the last of the Crusader states in the Levant. Thus they united Syria and Egypt for the longest interval between the Abbasid and Ottoman empires (1250–1517).

The Mamluks experienced a continual state of political conflict, military tension, proxy wars, and economic competition between the "Muslim territory" (Dar al-Islam) and "non-Muslim territory" (Dar al-Harb). The Battle of Ain Jalut and the glorious Battle of Marj al-Saffar (1303), the latter partly led by Imam Ibn Taymiyyah, marked the end of the Mongol invasions of the Levant. Fatwas given during these conflicts changed the course of Political Islam. As part of their chosen role as defenders of Islamic orthodoxy, the Mamluks sponsored many religious buildings, including mosques, madrasas and khanqahs. Though some construction took place in the provinces, the vast bulk of these projects expanded the capital. Many Mamluk buildings in Cairo have survived to this day, particularly in Old Cairo (for further informations, see Mamluk architecture).

=== Burji Sultans ===
See also: Islamic Egypt governors, Mamluks Era

== Al-Andalus ==
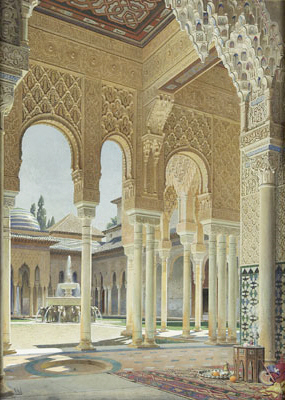
The interiors of the Alhambra in Granada, Spain decorated with arabesque designs.

The Arabs, under the command of the Berber General Tarik ibn Ziyad, first began their conquest of southern Spain or al-Andalus in 711. A raiding party led by Tarik was sent to intervene in a civil war in the Visigothic kingdom in Hispania. Crossing the Strait of Gibraltar (named after the General), it won a decisive victory in the summer of 711 when the Visigothic king Roderic was defeated and killed on 19 July at the Battle of Guadalete. Tariq's commander, Musa bin Nusair crossed with substantial reinforcements, and by 718 the Muslims dominated most of the peninsula. Some later Arabic and Christian sources present an earlier raid by a certain Ṭārif in 710 and also, the Ad Sebastianum recension of the Chronicle of Alfonso III, refers to an Arab attack incited by Erwig during the reign of Wamba (672–80). The two large armies may have been in the south for a year before the decisive battle was fought.

The rulers of Al-Andalus were granted the rank of Emir by the Umayyad Caliph Al-Walid I in Damascus. After the Abbasids came to power, some Umayyads fled to Muslim Spain to establish themselves there. By the end of the 10th century, the ruler Abd al-Rahman III took over the title of Caliph of Córdoba (912–961). Soon after, the Umayyads went on developing a strengthened state with its capital as Córdoba. Al-Hakam II succeeded to the Caliphate after the death of his father Abd ar-Rahman III in 961. He secured peace with the Christian kingdoms of northern Iberia, and made use of the stability to develop agriculture through the construction of irrigation works. Economic development was also encouraged through the widening of streets and the building of markets. The rule of the Caliphate is known as the heyday of Muslim presence in the peninsula.

The Umayyad Caliphate collapsed in 1031 due to political divisions and civil unrest during the rule of Hicham II who was ousted because of his indolence. Al-Andalus then broke up into a number of states called taifa kingdoms (Arabic, Muluk al-ṭawā'if; English, Petty kingdoms). The decomposition of the Caliphate into those petty kingdoms weakened the Muslims in the Iberian Peninsula vis-à-vis the Christian kingdoms of the north. Some of the taifas, such as that of Seville, were forced to enter into alliances with Christian princes and pay tributes in money to Castille.

=== Emirs of Al-Andalus ===
Abd al-Rahman I and Bedr (a former Greek slave) escaped with their lives after the popular revolt known as the Abbasid Revolution. Rahman I continued south through Palestine, the Sinai, and then into Egypt. Rahman I was one of several surviving Umayyad family members to make a perilous trek to Ifriqiya at this time. Rahman I and Bedr reached modern day Morocco near Ceuta. Next step would be to cross to sea to al-Andalus, where Rahman I could not have been sure whether he would be welcome. Following the Berber Revolt (740s), the province was in a state of confusion, with the Ummah torn by tribal dissensions among the Arabs and racial tensions between the Arabs and Berbers. Bedr lined up three Syrian commanders – Obeid Allah ibn Uthman and Abd Allah ibn Khalid, both originally of Damascus, and Yusuf ibn Bukht of Qinnasrin and contacted al-Sumayl (then in Zaragoza) to get his consent, but al-Sumayl refused, fearing Rahman I would try to make himself emir. After discussion with Yemenite commanders, Rahman I was told to go to al-Andalus. Shortly thereafter, he set off with Bedr and a small group of followers for Europe. Abd al-Rahman landed at Almuñécar in al-Andalus, to the east of Málaga.

During his brief time in Málaga, he quickly amassed local support. News of the prince's arrival spread throughout the peninsula. In order to help speed his ascension to power, he took advantage of the feuds and dissensions. However, before anything could be done, trouble broke out in northern al-Andalus. Abd al-Rahman and his followers were able to control Zaragoza. Rahman I fought to rule al-Andalus in a battle at the Guadalquivir river, just outside Córdoba on the plains of Musarah (Battle of Musarah). Rahman I was victorious, chasing his enemies from the field with parts of their army. Rahman I marched into the capital, Córdoba, fighting off a counterattack, but negotiations ended the confrontation. After Rahman I consolidated power, he proclaimed himself the al-Andalus emir. Rahman I did not claim the Muslim caliph, though. The last step was to have al-Fihri's general, al-Sumayl, garroted in Córdoba's jail. Al-Andalus was a safe haven for the house of Umayya that managed to evade the Abbasids.

In Baghdad, the Abbasid caliph al-Mansur had planned to depose the emir. Rahman I and his army confronted the Abbasids, killing most of the Abbasid army. The main Abbasid leaders were decapitated, their heads preserved in salt, with identifying tags pinned to their ears. The heads were bundled in a gruesome package and sent to the Abbasid caliph who was on pilgrimage at Mecca. Rahman I quelled repeated rebellions in al-Andalus. He began the building of the great mosque [cordova], and formed ship-yards along the coast; he is moreover said to have been the first to transplant the palm and the pomegranate into the congenial climate of Spain: and he encouraged science and literature in his states. He died on 29 September 788, after a reign of thirty-four years and one month.

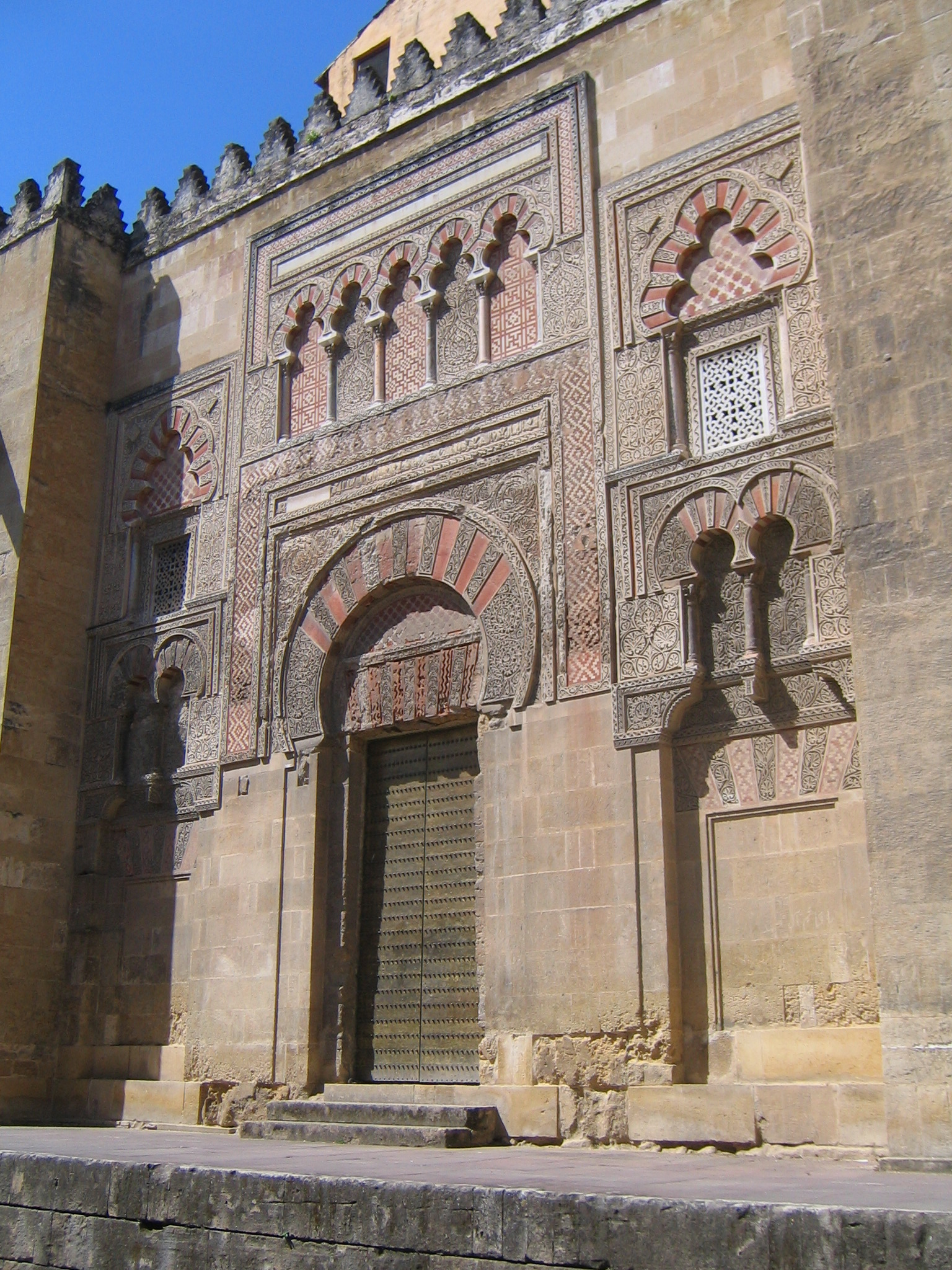
The exterior of the Mezquita.

Rahman I's successor was his son Hisham I. Born in Córdoba, he built many mosques and completed the Mezquita. He called for a jihad that resulted in a campaign against the Kingdom of Asturias and the County of Toulouse; in this second campaign he was defeated at Orange by William of Gellone, first cousin to Charlemagne. His successor Al-Hakam I came to power and was challenged by his uncles, other sons of Rahman I. One, Abdallah, went to the court of Charlemagne in Aix-la-Chapelle to negotiate for aid. In the meantime Córdoba was attacked, but was defended. Hakam I spent much of his reign suppressing rebellions in Toledo, Saragossa and Mérida.

Abd ar-Rahman II succeeded his father and engaged in nearly continuous warfare against Alfonso II of Asturias, whose southward advance he halted. Rahman II repulsed an assault by Vikings who had disembarked in Cádiz, conquered Seville (with the exception of its citadel) and attacked Córdoba. Thereafter he constructed a fleet and naval arsenal at Seville to repel future raids. He responded to William of Septimania's requests of assistance in his struggle against Charles the Bald's nominations.

Muhammad I's reign was marked by the movements of the Muwallad (ethnic Iberian Muslims) and Mozarabs (Muslim-Iberia Christians). Muhammad I was succeeded by his son Mundhir I. During the reign of his father, Mundhir I commanded military operations against the neighbouring Christian kingdoms and the Muwallad rebellions. At his father's death, he inherited the throne. During his two-year reign, Mundhir I fought against Umar ibn Hafsun. He died in 888 at Bobastro, succeeded by his brother Abdullah ibn Muhammad al-Umawi.

Umawi showed no reluctance to dispose of those he viewed as a threat. His government was marked by continuous wars between Arabs, Berbers and Muwallad. His power as emir was confined to the area of Córdoba, while the rest had been seized by rebel families. The son he had designated as successor was killed by one of Umawi's brothers. The latter was in turn executed by Umawi's father, who named as successor Abd ar-Rahman III, son of the killed son of Umawi.

==== Almoravid Iberia ====
Ifriqiyah, Iberian

== Africa ==
The Umayyad conquest of North Africa continued the century of rapid Muslim military expansion following the death of Muhammad in 632. By 640 the Arabs controlled Mesopotamia, had invaded Armenia, and were concluding their conquest of Byzantine Syria. Damascus was the seat of the Umayyad Caliphate. By the end of 641 all of Egypt was in Arab hands. A subsequent attempt to conquer the Nubian kingdom of Makuria was however repelled.

=== Maghreb ===
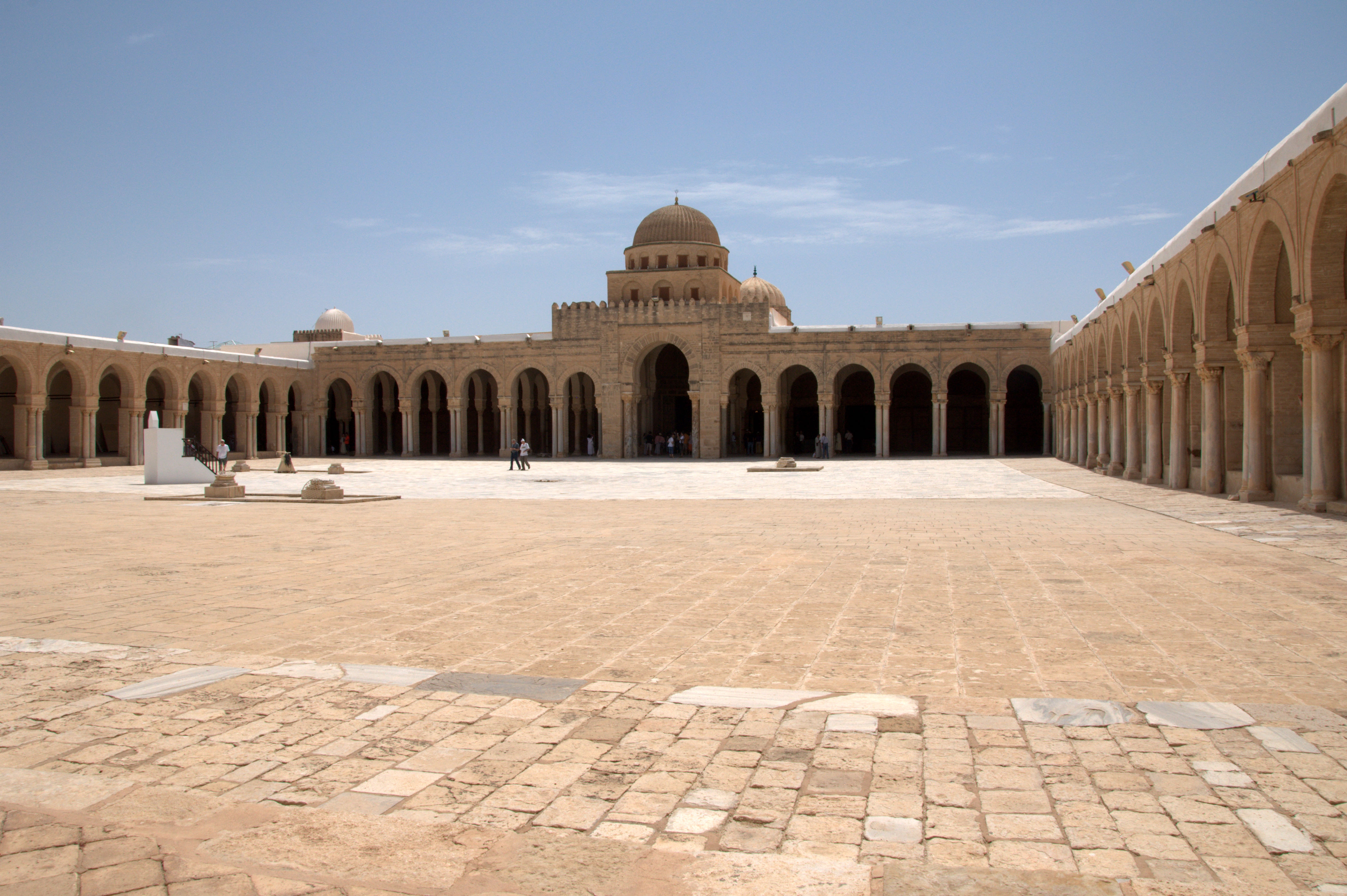
The Great Mosque of Kairouan also known as the Mosque of Uqba was established in 670 by the Arab general and conqueror Uqba ibn Nafi, it is the oldest mosque in the Maghreb, situated in the city of Kairouan, Tunisia.

Kairouan in Tunisia was the first city founded by Muslims in the Maghreb. Arab general Uqba ibn Nafi erected the city (in 670) and, in the same time, the Great Mosque of Kairouan considered as the oldest and most prestigious sanctuary in the western Islamic world.

This part of Islamic territory has had independent governments during most of Islamic history. The Idrisid were the first Arab rulers in the western Maghreb (Morocco), ruling from 788 to 985. The dynasty is named after its first sultan Idris I.

The Almoravid dynasty was a Berber dynasty from the Sahara flourished over a wide area of North-Western Africa and the Iberian Peninsula during the 11th century. Under this dynasty the Moorish empire was extended over present-day Morocco, Western Sahara, Mauritania, Gibraltar, Tlemcen (in Algeria) and a part of what is now Senegal and Mali in the south, and Spain and Portugal in the north.

The Almohad Dynasty or "the Unitarians", were a Berber Muslim religious power which founded the fifth Moorish dynasty in the 12th century, and conquered all Northern Africa as far as Egypt, together with Al-Andalus.

=== Horn of Africa ===
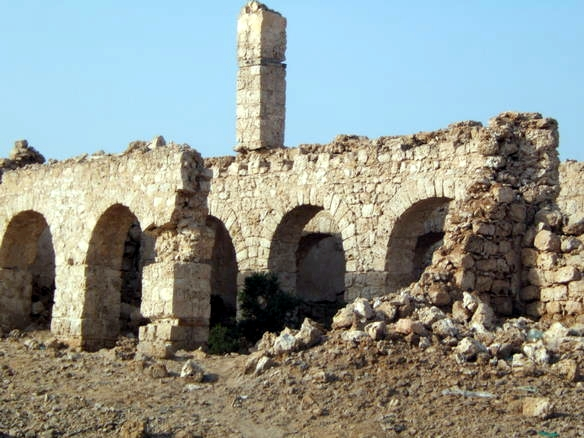
Ruins of Zeila (Saylac), Somalia.

The history of Islam in the Horn of Africa is almost as old as the faith itself. Through extensive trade and social interactions with their converted Muslim trading partners on the other side of the Red Sea, in the Arabian peninsula, merchants and sailors in the Horn region gradually came under the influence of the new religion.

Early Islamic disciples fled to the port city of Zeila in modern-day northern Somalia to seek protection from the Quraysh at the court of the Emperor of Aksum. Some of the Muslims that were granted protection are said to have then settled in several parts of the Horn region to promote the religion. The victory of the Muslims over the Quraysh in the 7th century had a significant impact on local merchants and sailors, as their trading partners in Arabia had by then all adopted Islam, and the major trading routes in the Mediterranean and the Red Sea came under the sway of the Muslim Caliphs. Instability in the Arabian peninsula saw further migrations of early Muslim families to the Somali seaboard. These clans came to serve as catalysts, forwarding the faith to large parts of the Horn region.

=== East African coast ===
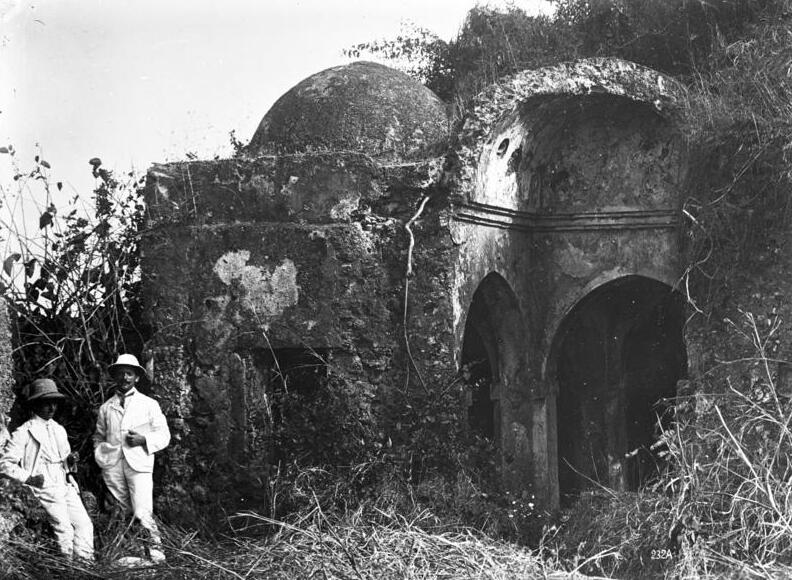
The Great Mosque of Kilwa

Islam came to the Swahili coast and South Eastern Africa along existing trade routes. They learned from them the manners of the Muslims and this led to their conversion by the Muslim Arabs.

Local Islamic governments centered in Tanzania (then Zanzibar). The people of Zayd were Muslims that immigrated to the region. In the pre-colonial period, the structure of Islamic authority here was held up through the Ulema (wanawyuonis, in Swahili language). These leaders had some degree of authority over most of the Muslims in South East Africa before territorial boundaries were established. The chief Qadi there was recognized for having the final religious authority.

=== West Africa ===
==== Early contacts ====
Much of what is known about the early history of Islam in West Africa derives from medieval accounts written by Arab and North African geographers and historians. After the rise of Islam in the seventh century, Islam was introduced into West Africa and spread gradually from the 8th century onward along pre-existing trans-Saharan trade networks linking the region with North Africa and the Mediterranean world. Early Muslim presence was largely confined to merchant communities, clerics, and segments of the ruling elite in Sahelian towns, where literacy, commerce, and diplomacy created favorable conditions for adoption. Rather than spreading through mass conversion, Islam initially functioned as a religion of trade, scholarship, and administration.

From the 8th to the early 11th centuries, Islam spread gradually as a class religion, serving as the faith of merchant, clerical, and administrative elites in Sudanic societies, while the broader population continued to follow indigenous religious traditions. Political authorities often regulated Muslim influence by segregating Muslim communities or limiting their participation in governance, a situation scholars describe as a stage of containment. Despite the expansion of Muslim communities across the Sahel, political authority largely remained non-Islamic during this period.

==== Islamic states ====
Over the following centuries(11th–16th centuries), Islam became increasingly integrated into state structures across the Sahel, as African rulers adopted the religion while continuing to govern populations with diverse religious practices. This period corresponds to what scholars describe as a stage of mixing, during which Islamic beliefs and institutions coexisted with, and were often adapted to, local religious and social traditions rather than replacing them entirely. Mystical Sufi brotherhoods began to spread throughout West Africa. These orders played an important role in social organization, education, and the diffusion of Islam, and they remained influential well into the 12th century.

One of the earliest known Islamic states in West Africa was the Kingdom of Takrur, located in the middle Senegal River valley. Its ruler, War Dyābī, converted to Islam in the early 11th century and promoted stricter Islamic practices, including the application of Islamic law, prior to the rise of the Almoravids. The Mali Empire incorporated Islamic institutions into its political system, where Islam functioned primarily as a court religion rather than a uniformly practiced popular faith. Its ruler, Mansa Musa, publicly demonstrated Mali's integration into the wider Islamic world through his pilgrimage to Mecca in 1324. Similar forms of Islamic integration and recognition occurred in other Sahelian polities, including the Hausa city-states and the Kingdom of Kanem-Bornu in present-day northern Nigeria.

The Songhai Empire, which succeeded Mali as the dominant power in the western Sahel, further expanded the role of Islam in state administration and public life. Although many inhabitants continued to practice indigenous religious systems, the Songhai state patronized Islamic institutions and sponsored mosques and centers of learning. Under Songhai rule, Timbuktu emerged as a major center of Islamic scholarship during the fifteenth and sixteenth centuries, attracting scholars from across North Africa and the broader Muslim world. The Great Mosque of Djenné in present-day Mali exemplifies the architectural and religious significance of Islam in the region and remains the largest earthen building in the world. After the Moroccan invasion of Songhai, merchant-scholars and religious elites dispersed from urban centers such as Timbuktu, contributing to the spread of Islamic learning among rural and pastoral communities across the Sahara and Sahel, many of which maintained indigenous practices.

==== Reform and resistance ====
From the 18th century onward, reformist movements emerged among West African Muslims who sought to eliminate practices they regarded as un-Islamic, including the blending of Islamic and local religious traditions, and to enforce Islamic law more fully. This period, often described as a stage of reform, was characterized by a series of jihads that led to the establishment of new Islamic states.

In 1802, Uthman dan Fodio, a Fulani scholar, led a major jihad in Hausaland that overthrew existing rulers and led to the creation of the Sokoto Caliphate. The new state centralized Muslim authority and introduced legal, educational, and administrative reforms based on Islamic principles. Dan Fodio's movement inspired subsequent jihads, including that of Umar Tal in the 1850s, who conquered several Bambara states, including the Ségou Empire and Kaarta in Senegambia, and expanded the influence of the Tijaniyyah Sufi order into parts of West Africa, including northern Nigeria.

These reformist jihads were followed in the 19th century by resistance movements and military campaigns against European colonial expansion, including those led by Samori Touré, a Mandinka military strategist and founder of the Wassoulou Empire, who opposed French forces until his capture in 1898; his successors were defeated in 1901. The French occupation of Senegal subsequently reshaped Islamic practice in the region, as some leaders of Sufi orders increasingly collaborated with colonial administrators.

Despite European colonial rule, Islam continued to spread across West Africa into the twentieth century, though its expansion remained uneven. Muslim influence met resistance in regions with strong kinship systems, ritual institutions, and indigenous religious traditions, particularly among Voltaic peoples. Some communities incorporated selected Islamic practices without fully converting, while in others conversion occurred primarily through military conquest rather than voluntary adoption. Where jihad states imposed Islam, these conversions were occasionally reversed following the collapse of the regimes and during the colonial period, when traditional religious authorities and community institutions regained authority.

By the late 19th and early 20th centuries, Islam had become a major religious force across much of West Africa, particularly in the Sahel and savanna zones. Its historical development reflects a long process of adaptation, negotiation, and reform rather than a single or uniform pattern of religious transformation.

== East Asia ==
=== Indian subcontinent ===
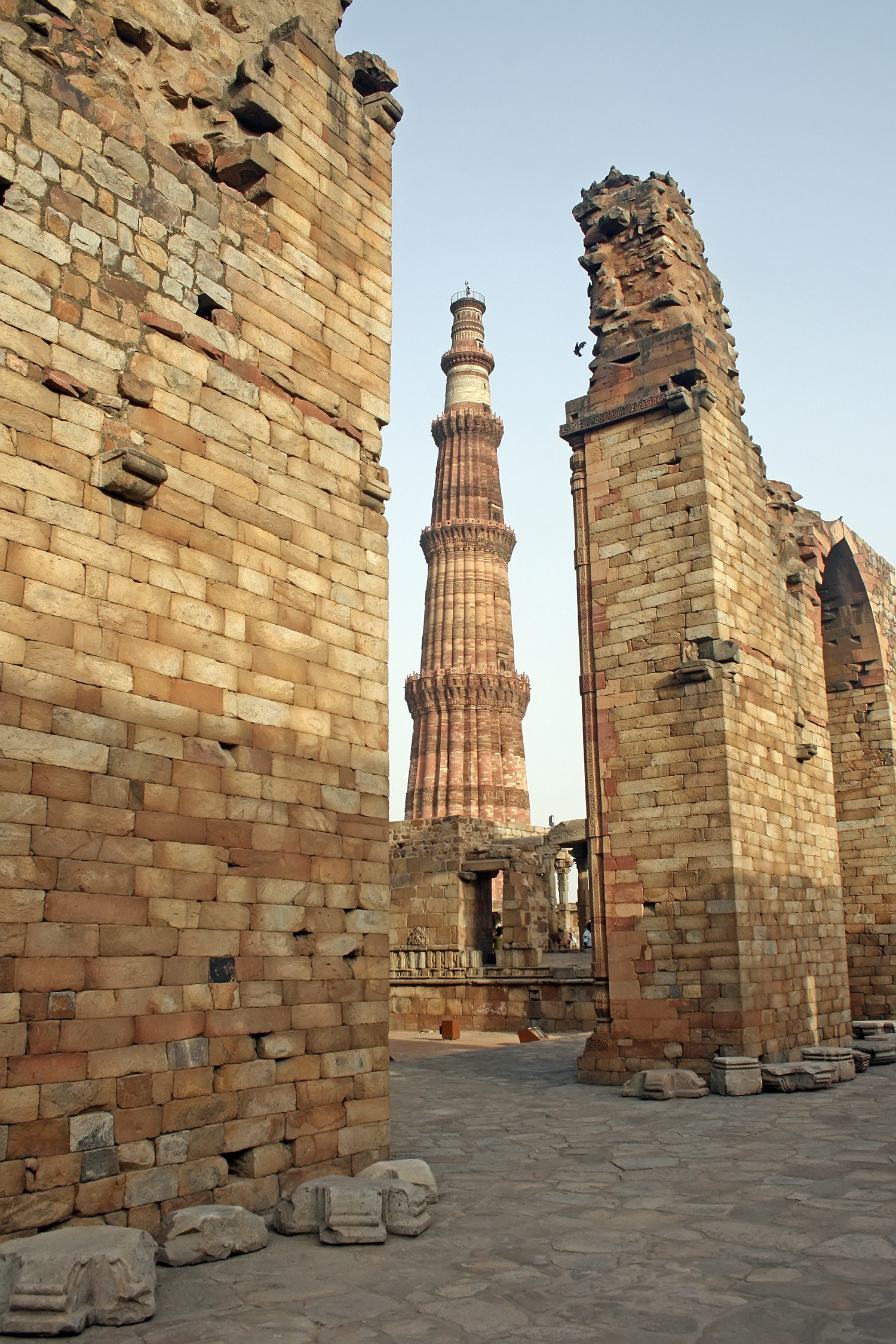
Qutub Minar is the world's tallest brick minaret, commenced by Qutb-ud-din Aybak of the Slave dynasty; 1st dynasty of the Delhi Sultanate.

On the Indian subcontinent, Islam first appeared in the southwestern tip of the peninsula, in today's Kerala state. Arabs traded with Malabar even before the birth of Muhammad. Native legends say that a group of Sahaba, under Malik Ibn Deenar, arrived on the Malabar Coast and preached Islam. According to that legend, the first mosque of India was built by Second Chera King Cheraman Perumal, who accepted Islam and received the name Tajudheen. Historical records suggest that the Cheraman Perumal Mosque was built in around 629.

Islamic rule first came to the Indian subcontinent in the 8th century, when Muhammad bin Qasim conquered Sindh, though this was a short-lived consolidation of Indian territory. Islamic conquests expanded under Mahmud of Ghazni in the 12th century CE, resulting in the establishment of the Ghaznavid Empire in the Indus River basin and the subsequent prominence of Lahore as an eastern bastion of Ghaznavid culture and rule. Ghaznavid rule was eclipsed by the Ghurid Empire of Muhammad of Ghor and Ghiyath al-Din Muhammad, whose domain under the conquests of Muhammad bin Bakhtiyar Khalji extended until the Bengal, where Indian Islamic missionaries achieved their greatest success in terms of dawah and number of converts to Islam. Qutb-ud-din Aybak conquered Delhi in 1206 and began the reign of the Delhi Sultanate, a successive series of dynasties that synthesized Indian civilization with the wider commercial and cultural networks of Africa and Eurasia, greatly increased demographic and economic growth in India and deterred Mongol incursion into the prosperous Indo-Gangetic plain and enthroned one of the few female Muslim rulers, Razia Sultana.

Many prominent sultanates and emirates administered various regions of the Indian subcontinent from the 13th to the 16th centuries, such as the Qutb Shahi, Gujarat, Kashmir, Bengal, Bijapur and Bahmani Sultanates, but none rivaled the power and extensive reach of the Mughal Empire at its zenith. The Bengal Sultanate in particular was a major global trading nation in the world, described by the Europeans to be the "richest country to trade with", while the Shah Mir dynasty ensured the gradual conversion of Kashmiris to Islam.

Persian culture, art, language, cuisine and literature grew in prominence in India due to Islamic administration and the immigration of soldiers, bureaucrats, merchants, Sufis, artists, poets, teachers and architects from Iran and Central Asia, resulting in the early development of Indo-Persian culture.

=== Southeast Asia ===
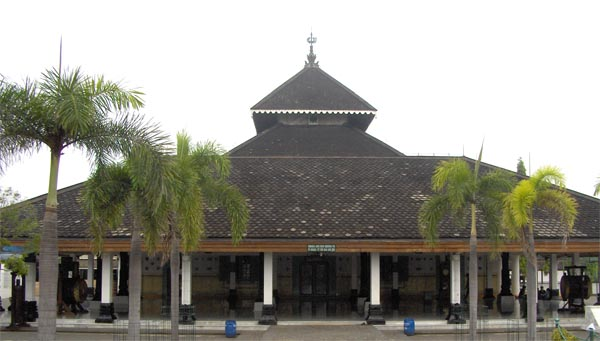
Grand Mosque of Demak, the first Muslim state in Java

Islam first reached Maritime Southeast Asia through traders from Mecca in the 7th century, particularly via the western part of what is now Indonesia. Arab traders from Yemen already had a presence in Asia through trading and travelling by sea, serving as intermediary traders to and from Europe and Africa. They traded not only Arabian goods but also goods from Africa, India, and so on which included ivory, fragrances, spices, and gold.

According to T. W. Arnold in The Preaching of Islam, by the 2nd century of the Islamic calendar, Arab traders had been trading with the inhabitants of Ceylon, modern-day Sri Lanka. The same argument has been told by Dr. B.H. Burger and Dr. Mr. Prajudi in Sedjarah Ekonomis Sosiologis Indonesia (History of Socio Economic of Indonesia). According to an atlas created by the geographer Al-Biruni (973–1048), the Indian or Indonesian Ocean used to be called the Persian Ocean. After Western Imperialist rule, this name was changed to reflect the name used today; the Indian Ocean.

Soon, many Sufi missionaries translated classical Sufi literature from Arabic and Persian into Malay; a tangible product of this is the Jawi script. Coupled with the composing of original Islamic literature in Malay, this led the way to the transformation of Malay into an Islamic language. Marco Polo detected an Islamic kingdom in Perlak, Sumatra in 1292. A powerful Islamic kingdom named Pasai was to grow from the north coast of Sumatra. The Sultanate of Malacca was founded on the Malay Peninsula by Parameswara, a Srivijayan Prince.

Through trade and commerce, Islam then spread to Borneo and Java. By the late 15th century, Islam had been introduced to the Philippines via the southern island of Mindanao. The foremost socio-cultural Muslim entities that resulted from this are the Sultanate of Sulu and Sultanate of Maguindanao; Islamised kingdoms in the northern Luzon island, such as the Kingdom of Maynila and the Kingdom of Tondo, were later conquered and Christianised with the majority of the archipelago by Spanish colonisers beginning in the 16th century.

As Islam spread, societal changes developed from the individual conversions, and five centuries later it emerged as a dominant cultural and political power in the region. Three main Muslim political powers emerged. The Aceh Sultanate was the most important, controlling much of the area between Southeast Asia and India from its centre in northern Sumatra. The Sultanate also attracted Sufi poets. The second Muslim power was the Sultanate of Malacca on the Malay Peninsula. The Sultanate of Demak on Java was the third power, where the emerging Muslim forces defeated the local Majapahit kingdom in the early 16th century. Although the sultanate managed to expand its territory somewhat, its rule remained brief.

Portuguese forces captured Malacca in 1511 under naval general Afonso de Albuquerque. With Malacca subdued, the Aceh Sultanate and Bruneian Empire established themselves as centres of Islam in Southeast Asia. The Sultanate's territory, although vastly diminished, remains intact to this day as the modern state of Brunei Darussalam.

=== China ===
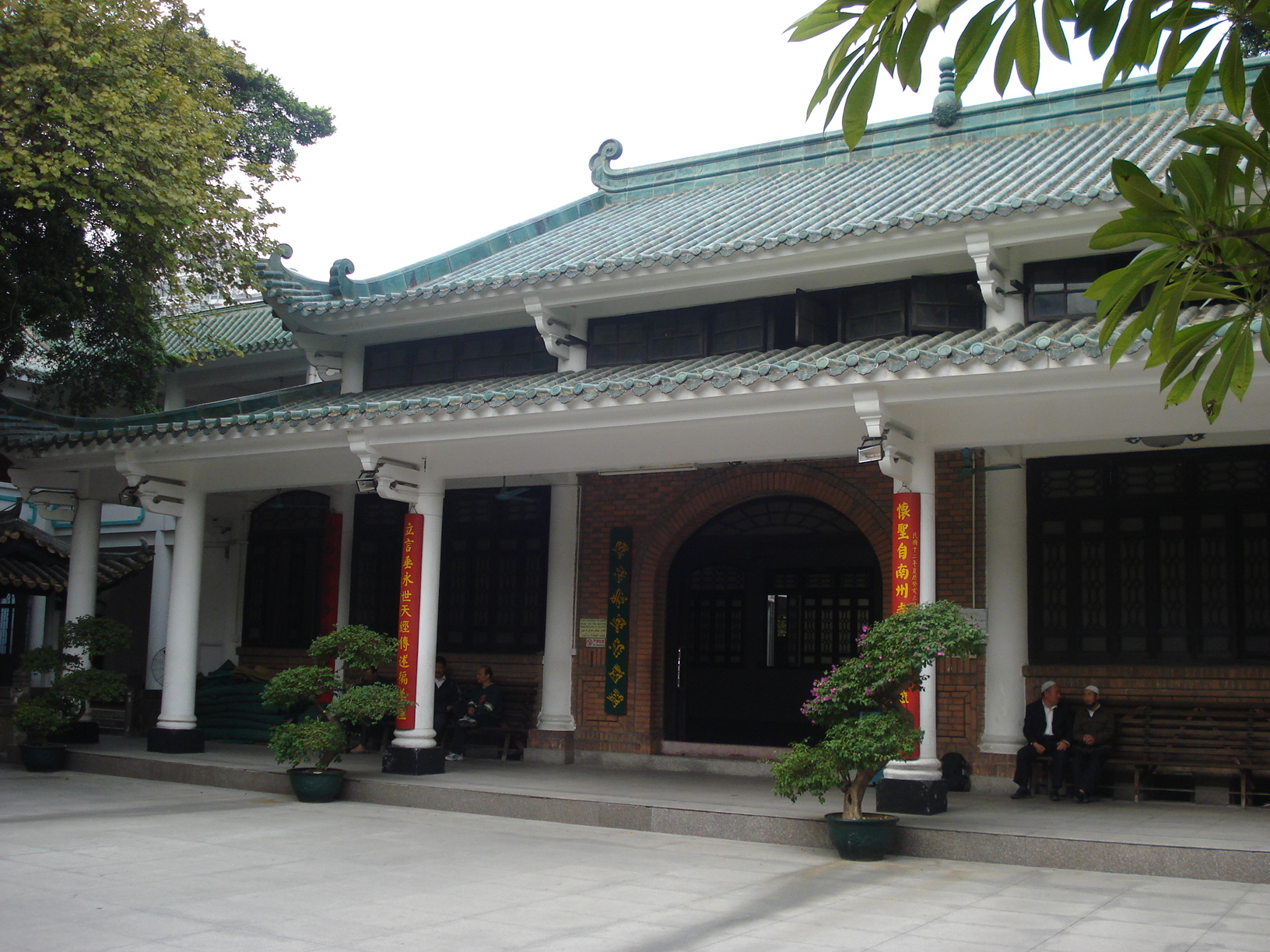
The Huaisheng Mosque of China, built by Sa'd ibn Abi Waqqas.

In China, four Sahabas (Sa'ad ibn abi Waqqas, Wahb Abu Kabcha, Jafar ibn Abu Talib and Jahsh ibn Riyab) preached in 616/17 and onwards after following the Chittagong–Kamrup (Sylhet)–Manipur route after sailing from Abyssinia in 615/16. After conquering Persia in 636, Sa'ad ibn abi Waqqas went with Sa'id ibn Zaid, Qais ibn Sa'd and Hassan ibn Thabit to China in 637 taking the complete Quran. Sa'ad ibn abi Waqqas headed for China for the third time in 650–51 after Caliph Uthman asked him to lead an embassy to China, which the Chinese emperor received.

== Early Modern period ==
In the 15th and 16th centuries three major Muslim empires formed: the Ottoman Empire in Anatolia, the Balkans, the Middle East, and North Africa; the Safavid Empire in Greater Iran; and the Mughal Empire in South Asia. These imperial powers were made possible by the discovery and exploitation of gunpowder and more efficient administration.

=== Ottoman Empire ===
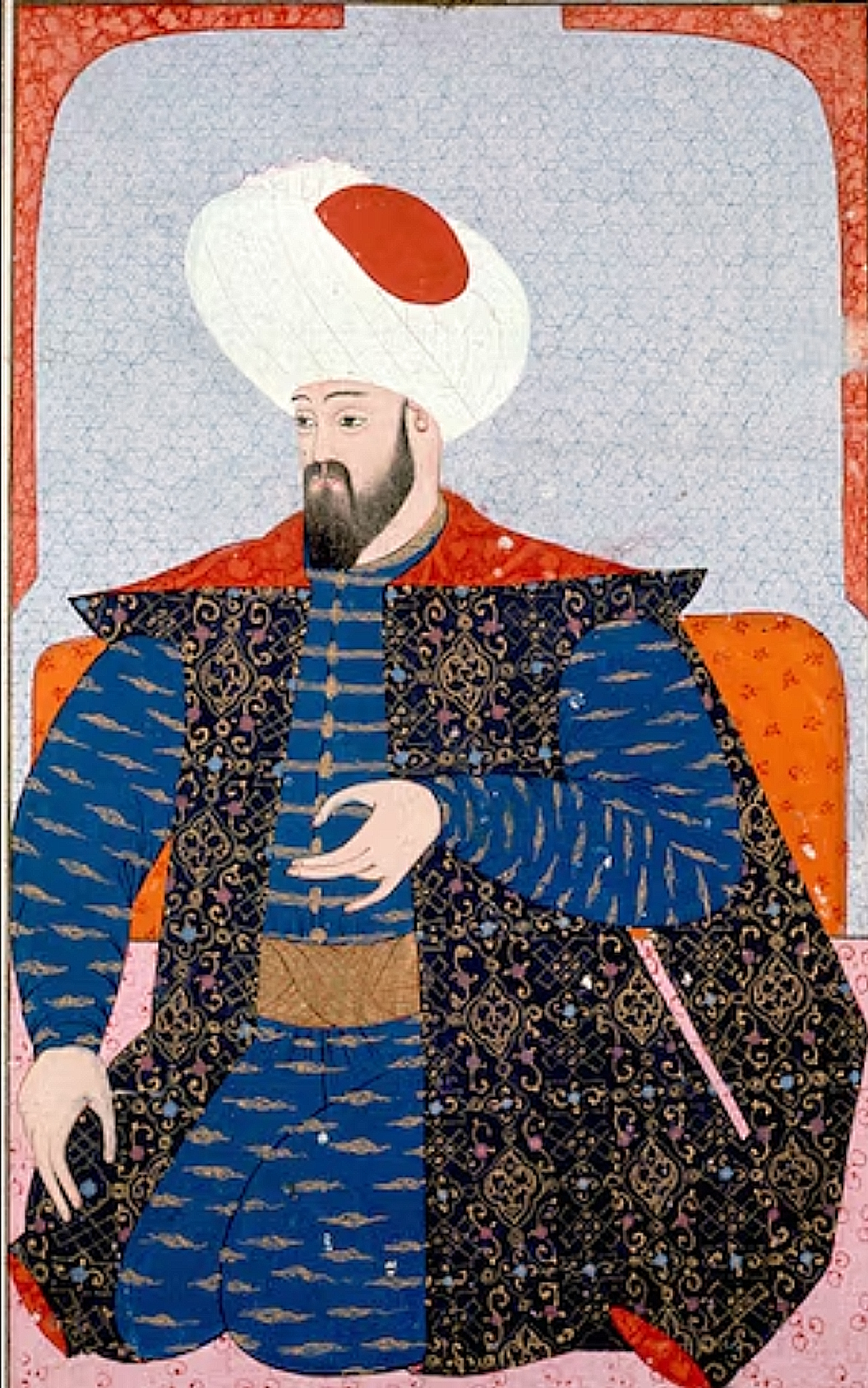
Osman I, founder of the Ottoman Empire. Ottoman miniature, 1579–1580, Topkapı Sarayı Müzesi, Istanbul.

According to Ottoman historiography, the legitimation of a ruler is attributed to Sheikh Edebali who interpreted a dream of Osman Gazi as God's legitimation of his reign. Since Murad I's conquest of Edirne in 1362, the caliphate was claimed by the Turkish sultans of the empire. During the period of Ottoman growth, claims on caliphal authority were recognized in 1517 as Selim I became the "Custodian of the Two Holy Mosques" in Mecca and Medina through the conquering and unification of Muslim lands, strengthening their claim to the caliphate in the Muslim world.

The Seljuq Turks declined in the second half of the 13th century, after the Mongol invasion of Anatolia. This resulted in the establishment of multiple Turkish principalities, known as beyliks. Osman I, the founder of the Ottoman dynasty, assumed leadership of one of these principalities (Söğüt) at the end of the 13th century, succeeding his father Ertuğrul. Osman I afterwards led it in a series of battles with the Byzantine Empire. By 1331, the Ottoman Turks had captured Nicaea, the former Byzantine capital, under the leadership of Osman's son and successor, Orhan I. Victory at the Battle of Kosovo against the Serbian Empire in 1389 then facilitated their expansion into Europe. The Ottomans were established in the Balkans and Anatolia by the time Bayezid I ascended to power in the same year, now at the helm of a growing empire.

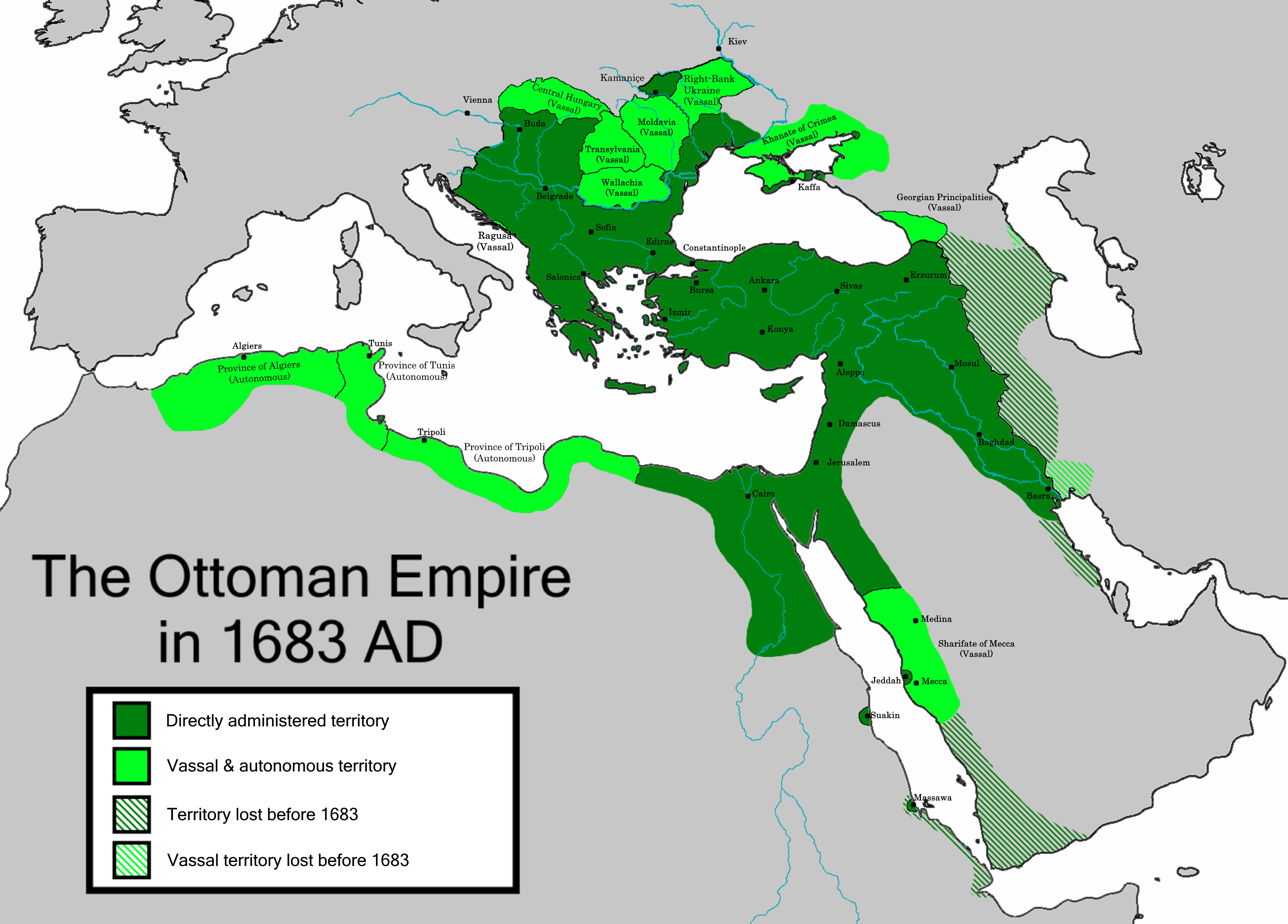
The Ottoman Empire and sphere of influence at its greatest extent (1683)

Growth halted when Mongol warlord Timur (also known as "Tamerlane") captured Bayezid I in the Battle of Ankara in 1402, beginning the Ottoman Interregnum. This episode was characterized by the division of the Ottoman territory amongst Bayezid I's sons, who submitted to Timurid authority. When a number of Ottoman territories regained independent status, ruin for the Empire loomed. However, the empire recovered as the youngest son of Bayezid I, Mehmed I, waged offensive campaigns against his ruling brothers, thereby reuniting Asia Minor and declaring himself sultan in 1413. Around 1512 the Ottoman naval fleet developed under the rule of Selim I, such that the Ottoman Turks were able to challenge the Republic of Venice, a naval power which established its thalassocracy alongside the other Italian maritime republics upon the Mediterranean Region. They also attempted to reconquer the Balkans. By the time of Mehmed I's grandson, Mehmed II (ruled 1444–1446; 1451–1481), the Ottomans could lay siege to Constantinople, the capital of Byzantium. A factor in this siege was the use of muskets and large cannons introduced by the Ottomans. The Byzantine fortress succumbed in 1453, after 54 days of siege. Without its capital the Byzantine Empire disintegrated. The future successes of the Ottomans and later empires would depend upon the exploitation of gunpowder.

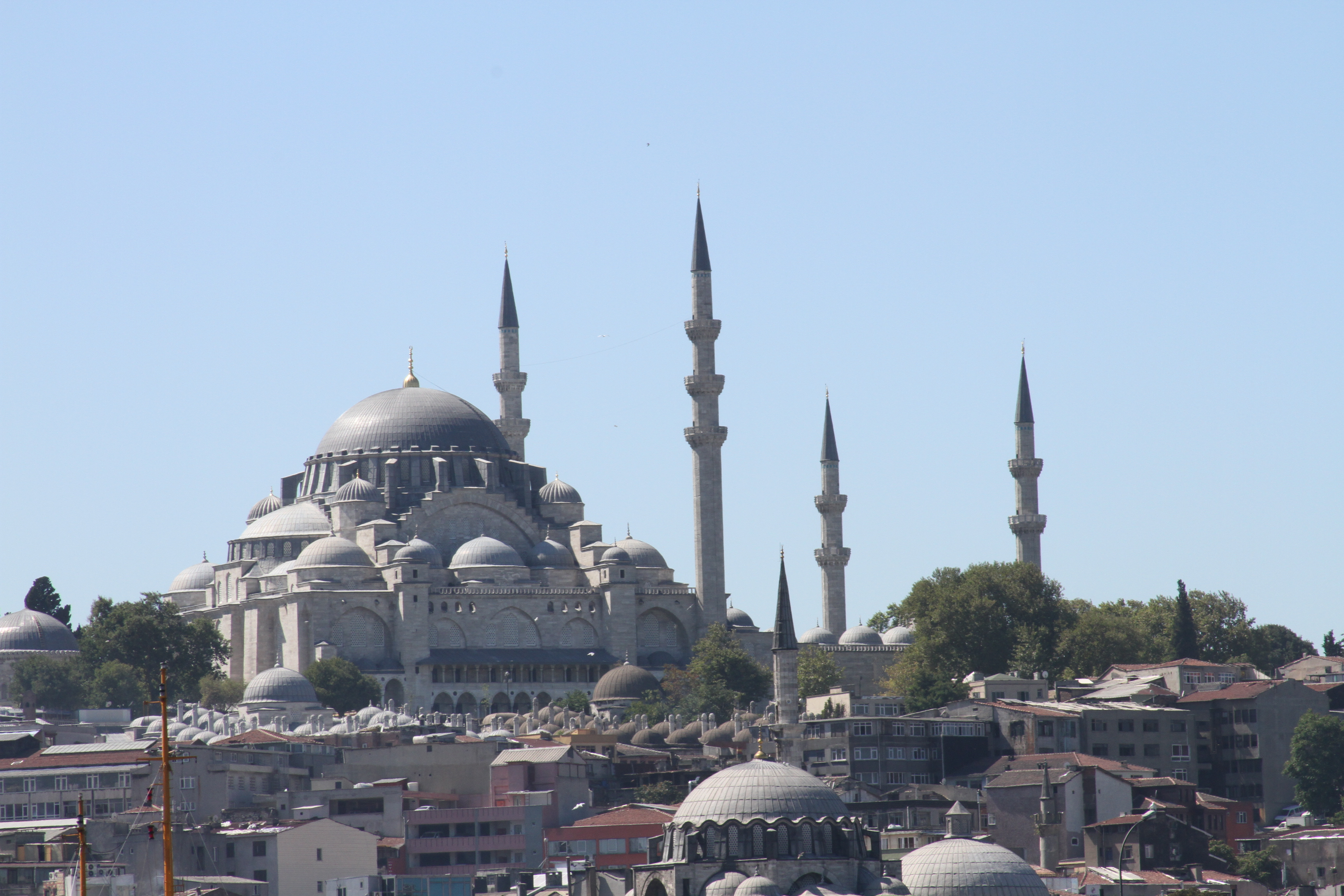
The Süleymaniye Mosque (Süleymaniye Camii) in Istanbul was built on the order of sultan Suleiman the Magnificent by the Ottoman architect Mimar Sinan in 1557.

In the early 16th century, the Shiʿite Safavid dynasty assumed control in Persia under the leadership of Shah Ismail I, defeating the ruling Turcoman federation Aq Qoyunlu (also called the "White Sheep Turkomans") in 1501. The Ottoman sultan Selim I sought to repel Safavid expansion, challenging and defeating them at the Battle of Chaldiran in 1514. Selim I also deposed the ruling Mamluks in Egypt, absorbing their territories in 1517. Suleiman I (nicknamed "Suleiman the Magnificent"), Selim I's successor, took advantage of the diversion of Safavid focus to the Uzbeks on the eastern frontier and recaptured Baghdad, which had fallen under Safavid control. Despite this, Safavid power remained substantial, rivalling the Ottomans. Suleiman I advanced deep into Hungary following the Battle of Mohács in 1526 – reaching as far as the gates of Vienna thereafter, and signed a Franco-Ottoman alliance with Francis I of France against Charles V of the Holy Roman Empire 10 years later. While Suleiman I's rule (1520–1566) is often identified as the apex of Ottoman power, the empire continued to remain powerful and influential until a relative fall in its military strength in the second half of the 18th century.

=== Safavid Empire ===
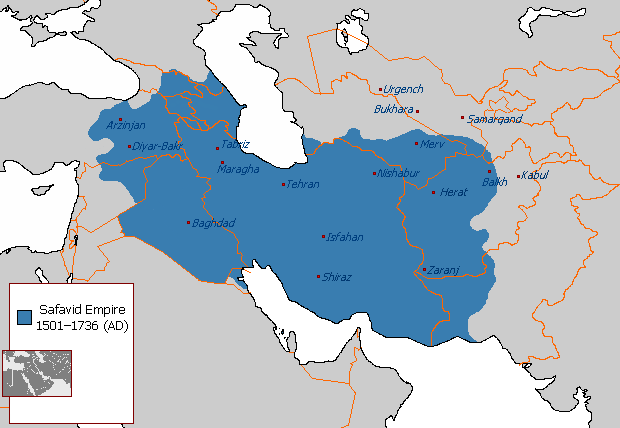
The Safavid Empire at its greatest extent under Shah Ismail I (1501–1524)

The Shīʿīte Safavid dynasty rose to power in Tabriz in 1501 and later conquered the rest of Iran. They were of mixed ancestry, originally Kurdish, but during their rule intermarried with Turcomans, Georgians, Circassians, and Pontic Greeks. The Safavid dynasty had its origin in the Safavid order of Sufism, while the Iranian population was largely composed by Sunni Muslims. After their defeat at the hands of the Sunni Ottomans at the Battle of Chaldiran, to unite the Persians behind him, Shah Ismail I made conversion mandatory for the largely Sunni population of Iran to the Twelver sect of Shīʿa Islam so that he could get them to fight against the Sunni Ottomans.

This resulted in the Safavid conversion of Iran to Shīʿa Islam. Iranian Zaydis, the largest group amongst the Shīʿa Muslims before the Safavid rule, were also forced to convert to the Twelver denomination of Shīʿa Islam. The Zaydis at that time subscribed to the Hanafi jurisprudence, as did most Sunnis, and there were good relations between them. Abu Hanifah and Zayd ibn Ali were also very good friends. The Safavid dynasty from Azarbaijan ruled from 1501 to 1736; they established Twelver Shīʿīsm as the official religion of Safavid Iran and united its provinces under a single sovereignty, thereby reigniting the Persian identity.

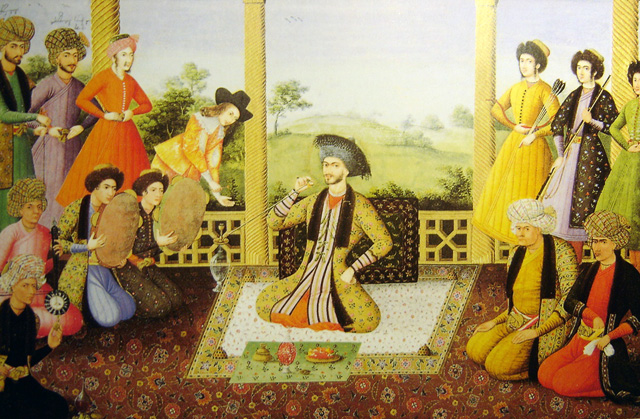
Shah Suleiman I and his courtiers, Isfahan, 1670. Painter is Ali Qoli Jabbador, and is kept at The St. Petersburg Institute of Oriental Studies in Russia, ever since it was acquired by Tsar Nicholas II. Note the two Georgian figures with their names at the top left.

In 1524, Tahmasp I acceded to the throne, initiating a revival of the arts. Carpetmaking became a major industry. The tradition of Persian miniature painting in manuscripts reached its peak, until Tahmasp turned to strict religious observance in middle age, prohibiting the consumption of alcohol and hashish and removing casinos, taverns, and brothels. Tahmasp's nephew Ibrahim Mirza continued to patronize a last flowering of the arts until he was murdered, after which many artists were recruited by the Mughal dynasty.

Tahmasp's grandson, Shah Abbas I, restored the shrine of the eighth Twelver Shīʿīte Imam, Ali al-Ridha at Mashhad, and restored the dynastic shrine at Ardabil. Both shrines received jewelry, fine manuscripts, and Chinese porcelains. Abbas moved the capital to Isfahan, revived old ports, and established thriving trade with Europeans. Amongst Abbas' most visible cultural achievements was the construction of Naqsh-e Jahan Square ("Design of the World"). The plaza, located near a Friday mosque, covered 20 acres (81,000 m^{2}). The Safavid dynasty was toppled in 1722 by the Hotaki dynasty, which ended their forceful conversion of Sunni areas to Twelver Shīʿīsm.

=== Mughal Empire ===
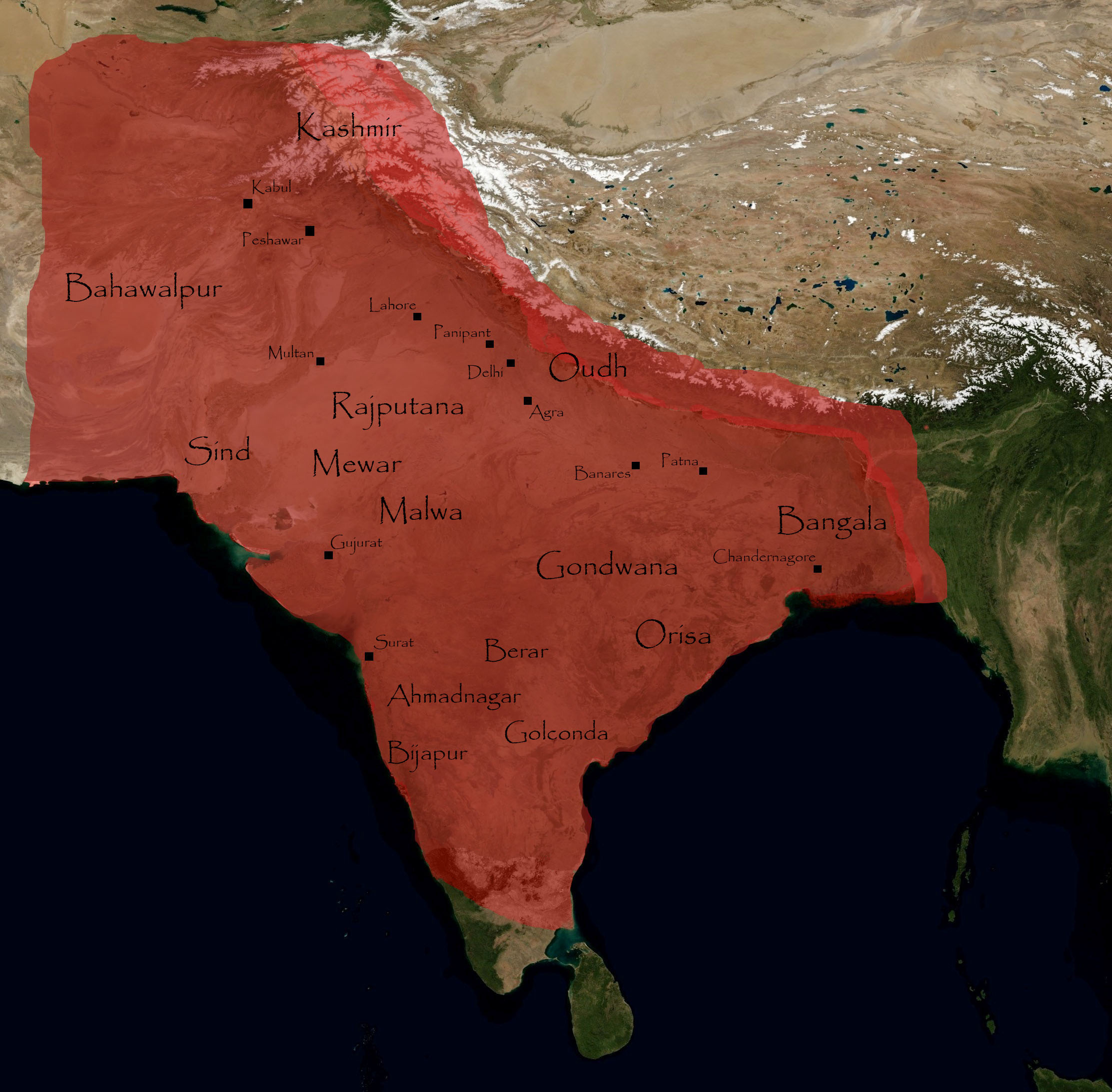
Mughal India at its greatest extent, at the sharia apogee of Muhammad Aurangzeb Alamgir.

Mughal Empire was a power that comprised almost all of South Asia, founded in 1526. It was established and ruled by the Timurid dynasty, with Turco-Mongol Chagatai roots from Central Asia, claiming direct descent from both Genghis Khan (through his son Chagatai Khan) and Timur, and with significant Indian and Persian ancestry through marriage alliances; the first two Mughal emperors had both parents of Central Asian ancestry, while successive emperors were of predominantly Indo-Persian ancestry. The dynasty was Indo-Persian in culture, combining Persianate culture with local Indian cultural influences visible in its court culture and administrative customs.

The beginning of the empire is conventionally dated to the victory by its founder Babur over Ibrahim Lodi, the last ruler of the Delhi Sultanate, in the First Battle of Panipat (1526). During the reign of Humayun, the successor of Babur, the empire was briefly interrupted by the Sur Empire established by Sher Shah Suri, who re-established the Grand Trunk Road across the northern Indian subcontinent, initiated the rupee currency system and developed much of the foundations of the effective administration of Mughal rule. The "classic period" of the Mughal Empire began in 1556, with the ascension of Akbar to the throne. Some Rajput kingdoms continued to pose a significant threat to the Mughal dominance of northwestern India, but most of them were subdued by Akbar. All Mughal emperors were Muslims; Akbar, however, propounded a syncretic religion in the latter part of his life called Dīn-i Ilāhī, as recorded in historical books like Ain-i-Akbari and Dabistān-i Mazāhib. The Mughal Empire did not try to intervene in native societies during most of its existence, rather co-opting and pacifying them through concilliatory administrative practices and a syncretic, inclusive ruling elite, leading to more systematic, centralized and uniform rule. Traditional and newly coherent social groups in northern and western India, such as the Marathas, the Rajputs, the Pashtuns, the Hindu Jats and the Sikhs, gained military and governing ambitions during Mughal rule which, through collaboration or adversity, gave them both recognition and military experience.

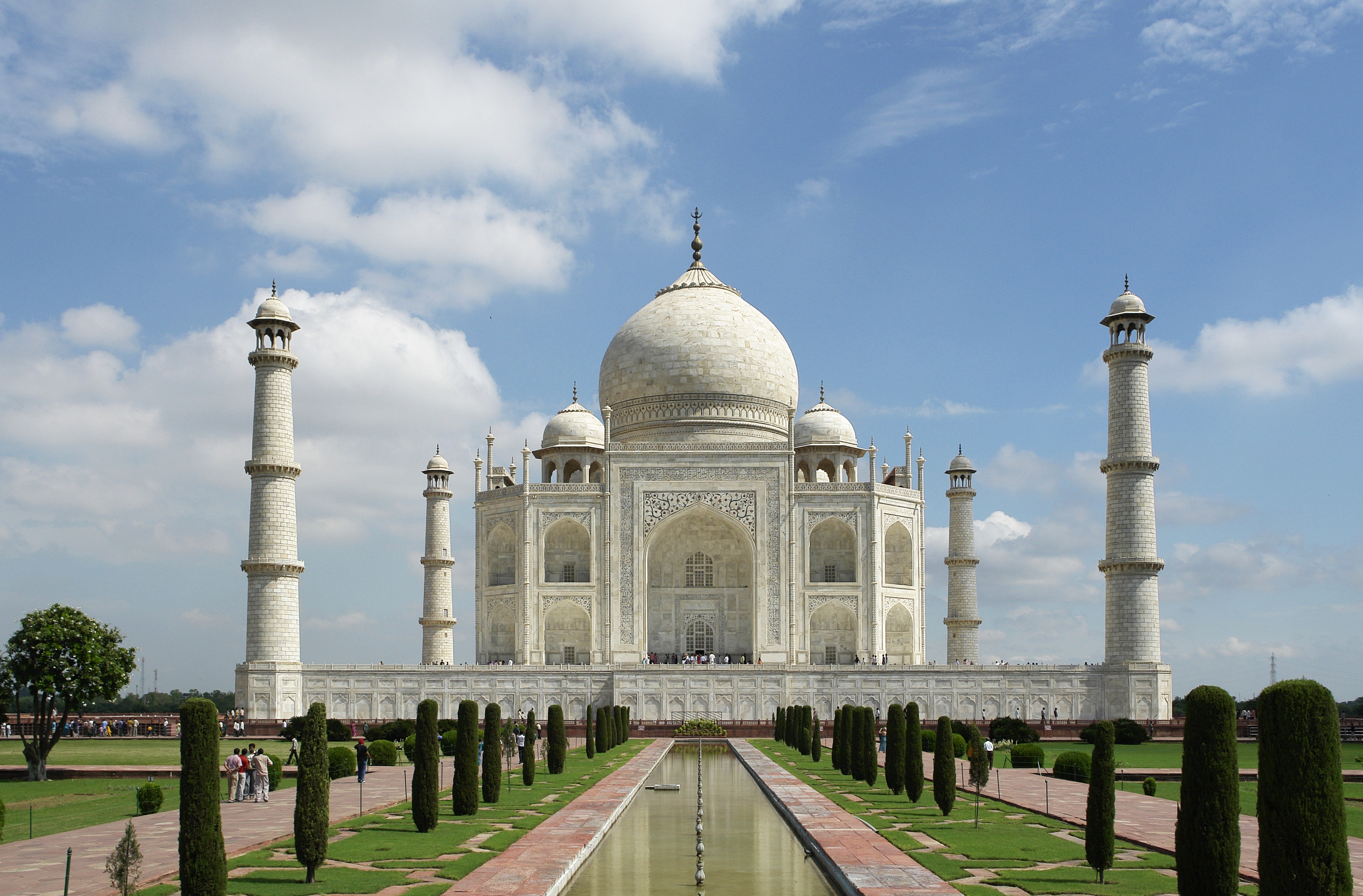
Taj Mahal is a mausoleum built by Mughal Emperor Shah Jahan to house the tomb of his favourite wife, Mumtaz Mahal.

The reign of Shah Jahan (1628–1658) represented the height of Mughal architecture, with famous monuments such as the Taj Mahal, Moti Masjid, Red Fort, Jama Masjid and Lahore Fort being constructed during his reign.

The sharia reign of Muhammad Auranzgeb witnessed the establishment of the Fatawa-e-Alamgiri. Muslim India became the world's largest economy, valued 25% of world GDP. Its richest province, Bengal Subah, which was a world leading economy and had better conditions than 18th century Western Europe, showed signs of the Industrial Revolution, through the emergence of the period of proto-industrialization. Numerous conflicts such as the Anglo-Mughal War were also witnessed.

After the death of Aurangzeb, which marks the end of Medieval India and beginning of the European colonialism in India, internal dissatisfaction arose due to the weakness of the empire's administrative and economic systems, leading to its break-up and declarations of independence of its former provinces by the Nawab of Bengal, the Nawab of Awadh, the Nizam of Hyderabad, the major economic and military power known as Kingdom of Mysore ruled by Tipu Sultan and other small states. In 1739, the Mughals were crushingly defeated in the Battle of Karnal by the forces of Nader Shah, the founder of the Afsharid dynasty in Persia, and Delhi was sacked and looted, drastically accelerating their decline.

In 1757, the East India Company overtook Bengal Subah at the Battle of Plassey. By the mid-18th century, the Marathas had routed Mughal armies and won over several Mughal provinces from the Punjab to Bengal.

Tipu Sultan's Kingdom of Mysore based in South India, which witnessed partial establishment of sharia based economic and military policies i.e. Fathul Mujahidin, replaced Bengal ruled by the Nawabs of Bengal as South Asia's foremost economic territory. The Anglo-Mysore Wars were fought between Hyder Ali, his son Tipu and their French allies, including Napoleon Bonaparte, and the East India Company. Rocket artillery and the world's first iron-cased rockets, the Mysorean rockets, were used during the war and the Jihad based Fathul Mujahidin was compiled.

During the following century Mughal power had become severely limited, and the last emperor, Bahadur Shah II, had authority over only the city of Shahjahanabad. Bahadur issued a firman supporting the Indian Rebellion of 1857. Consequent to the rebellion's defeat he was tried by the East India Company authorities for treason, imprisoned, and exiled to Rangoon. The last remnants of the empire were formally taken over by the British, and the British parliament passed the Government of India Act to enable the Crown formally to nationalize the East India Company and assume direct control of India in the form of the new British Raj.

== Modern period ==
=== Ottoman Empire partition ===
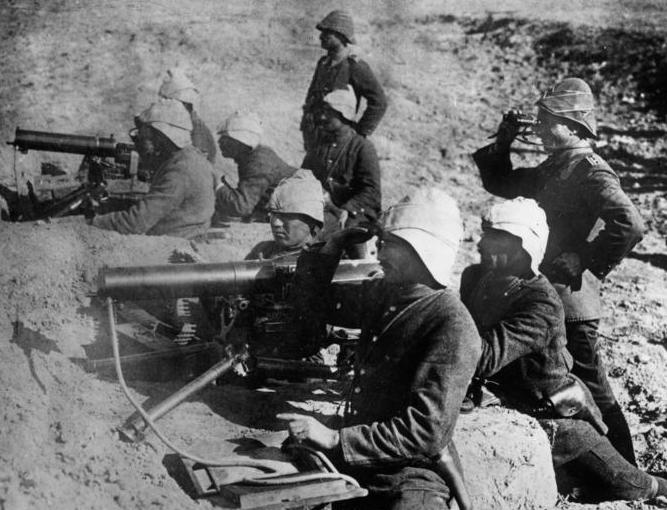
Ottoman army in World War I

By the end of the 19th century, the Ottoman Empire had declined. The decision to back Germany in World War I meant they shared the Central Powers' defeat in that war. The defeat led to the overthrow of the Ottomans by Turkish nationalists led by the victorious general of the Battle of Gallipoli: Mustafa Kemal, who became known to his people as Atatürk, "Father of the Turks." Atatürk was credited with renegotiating the treaty of Sèvres (1920) which ended Turkey's involvement in the war and establishing the modern Republic of Turkey, which was recognized by the Allies in the Treaty of Lausanne (1923). Atatürk went on to implement an ambitious program of modernization that emphasized economic development and secularization. He transformed Turkish culture to reflect European laws, adopted Arabic numerals, the Latin script, separated the religious establishment from the state, and emancipated woman—even giving them the right to vote in parallel with women's suffrage in the west.

During the First World War, the Allies cooperated with Arab partisans against the Ottoman Empire, both groups being united in opposition to a common enemy. The most prominent example of this was during the Arab Revolt, when the British, led by secret intelligence agent T. E. Lawrence—better known as "Lawrence of Arabia" cooperated with Arab guerillas against the Ottoman forces, eventually securing the withdrawal of all Ottoman troops from the region by 1918. Following the end of the war, the vast majority of former Ottoman territory outside of Asia Minor was handed over to the victorious European powers as protectorates. However, many Arabs were left dismayed by the Balfour Declaration, which directly contradicted the McMahon–Hussein Correspondence publicized only a year earlier. Ottoman successor states include today's Albania, Bosnia and Herzegovina, Bulgaria, Egypt, Greece, Iraq, Israel, Lebanon, Romania, Saudi Arabia, Serbia, Syria, Jordan, Turkey, Balkan states, North Africa and the north shore of the Black Sea.

=== Arab–Israeli conflict ===
The Arab–Israeli conflict spans about a century of political tensions and open hostilities. It involves the establishment of the modern State of Israel as a Jewish nation state, the consequent displacement of the Palestinian people and Jewish exodus from Arab and Muslim countries, as well as the adverse relationship between the Arab world and the State of Israel (see: Israeli–Palestinian conflict). Despite at first involving only the Arab states bordering Israel, animosity has also developed between Israel and other predominantly Muslim-majority countries.

The State of Israel came into existence on 14 May 1948 as a polity to serve as the homeland for the Jewish people. It was also defined in its declaration of independence as a "Jewish state", a term that also appeared in the United Nations Partition Plan for British Palestine in 1947. The related term of "Jewish and democratic state" dates from a 1992 legislation by Israel's Knesset.

The Six-Day War of 5–10 June 1967, was fought between Israel and the neighbouring states of Egypt, Jordan, and Syria. The Arab countries closed the Suez Canal and it was followed in May 1970 by the closure of the "tapline" from Saudi Arabia through Syria to Lebanon. These developments had the effect of increasing the importance of petroleum in Libya, which is a short (and canal-free) shipping distance from Europe. In 1970, Occidental Petroleum broke with other oil companies and accepted the Arab demands for price increases.

In October 1973, a new war between Israel and its Muslim neighbours, known as the Yom Kippur War, broke out just as the oil companies began meeting with the Organization of Arab Petroleum Exporting Countries (OAPEC). Its leaders had been emboldened by the success of Sadat's campaigns and the war strengthened their unity. In response to the emergency resupply effort by the Western Bloc that enabled Israel to put up a resistance against the Egyptian and Syrian forces, the Arab world imposed the 1973 oil embargo against the United States and Western Europe. Faisal agreed that Saudi Arabia would use some of its oil wealth to finance the "front-line states", those that bordered Israel, in their struggle. The centrality of petroleum, the Arab–Israeli conflict, political and economic instability, and uncertainty about the future remain constant features of the politics of the region.

Many countries, individuals, and non-governmental organizations elsewhere in the world feel involved in this conflict for reasons such as cultural and religious ties with Islam, Arab culture, Christianity, Judaism, Jewish culture, or for ideological, human rights, or strategic reasons. Although some consider the Arab–Israeli conflict a part of (or a precursor to) a wider clash of civilizations between the Western world and the Muslim world, others oppose this view. Animosity emanating from this conflict has caused numerous attacks on supporters (or perceived supporters) of each side by supporters of the other side in many countries around the world.

=== Other Islamic affairs ===
Modern Islamic world

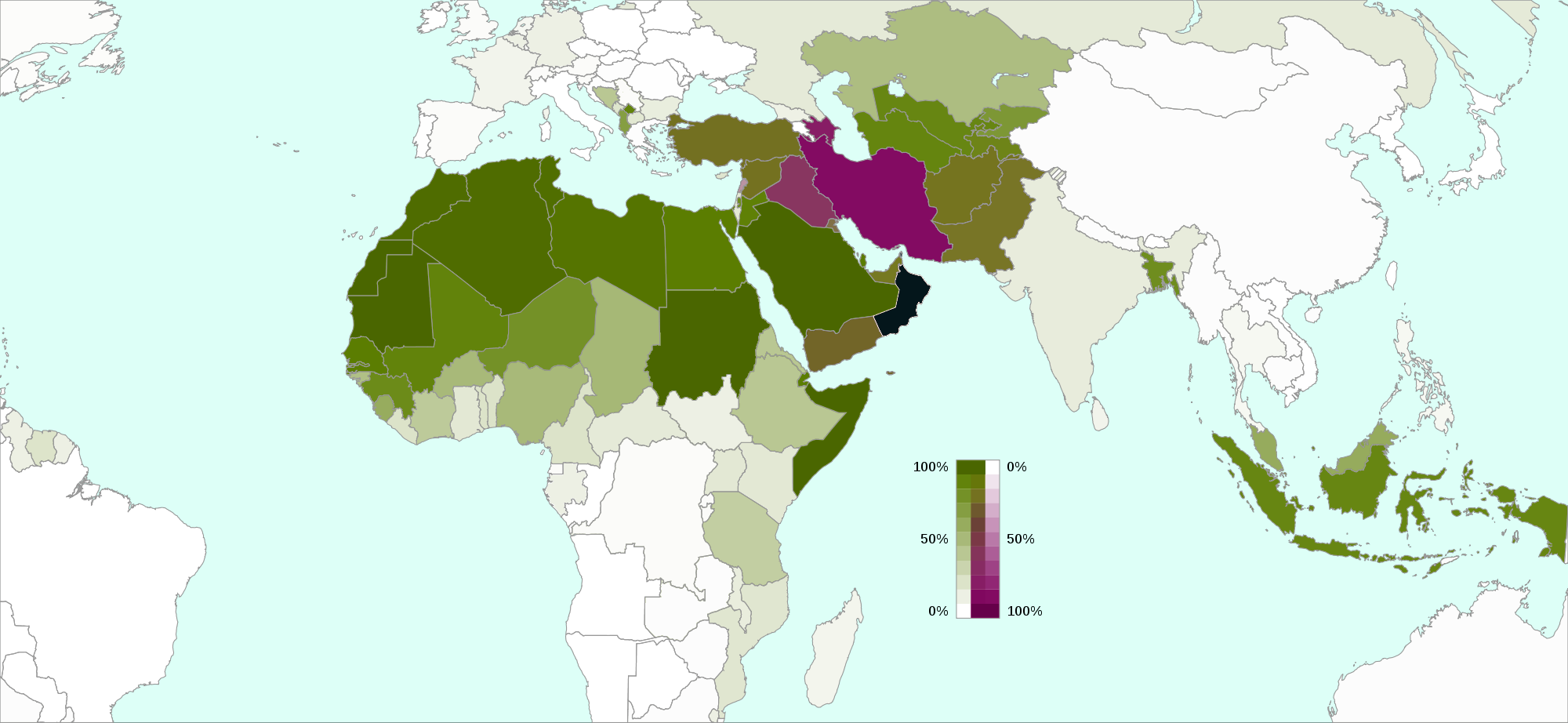
Islam in the modern world

- Sunni Islam
- Shia Islam
- Ibadi Islam

In 1979 the Iranian revolution transformed Iran from a constitutional monarchy to a populist theocratic Islamic republic under the rule of Ayatollah Ruhollah Khomeini, a Shi'i Muslim cleric and marja. Following the Revolution, a new constitution was approved and a referendum established the government, electing Ruhollah Khomeini as Supreme Leader. During the following two years, liberals, leftists, and Islamic groups fought each other, and the Islamics captured power.

The development of the two opposite fringes, the Safavid conversion of Iran to Shia Islam, the Twelver Shia version, and its reinforcement by the Iranian revolution and the Salafi in Saudi Arabia, coupled with the Iran–Saudi Arabia relations resulted in these governments using sectarian conflict to enhance their political interests. Gulf states such as Saudi Arabia and Kuwait (despite being hostile to Iraq) encouraged Saddam Hussein to invade Iran, which resulted in the Iran–Iraq War, as they feared that an Islamic revolution would take place within their own borders. Certain Iranian exiles also helped convince Saddam that if he invaded, the fledgling Islamic republic would quickly collapse.

== See also ==
- Decline and modernization of the Ottoman Empire
- Education in Islam
- History of homosexuality in the Muslim world
- History of the Quran
- History of slavery in the Muslim world
  - Arab slave trade
  - Barbary slave trade
  - Devshirme
  - Ghilman
  - Houri
  - Islamic views on slavery
  - Mamluk
  - Saqaliba
  - Slavery in the Ottoman Empire
- Islam and democracy
- Islam and modernity
- Islam and secularism
- Islam and violence
- Islam and war
- Islam by country
- Islamic art
- Islamic attitudes towards science
- Islamic culture
- Islamic eschatology
- Islamic philosophy
- Islamic schools and branches
  - Schools of Islamic jurisprudence
  - Schools of Islamic theology
- Islamism
- List of Muslim military leaders
- List of Muslim states and dynasties
- Political aspects of Islam
- Political philosophy of the Islamic Golden Age
- Political quietism in Islam
- Pre-Islamic Arabia
- Religion in pre-Islamic Arabia
- Sectarian violence among Muslims
- Transformation of the Ottoman Empire
