= List of Seljuk sultans of Hamadan (1118–1194) =

The rulers of western Persia, who maintained a very loose grip on the Abbasids of Baghdad. Several Turkish emirs gained a strong level of influence in the region, such as the Eldiduzids.

- Mahmud II 1118-1131
- Da'ud (in Jibal and Iranian Azerbaijan) 1131
- Tugrul II 1131-1134
- Mas'ud 1134-1152
- Malik Shah III 1152-1153
- Muhammad II 1153-1160
- Suleiman Shah 1160-1161
- Arslan Shah 1161-1174
- Tugrul III 1174-1194

Tugrul III killed in battle with the Khwarazmshah, who annexes Hamadan
