= List of sultans of the Seljuk Empire =

Sultans of the Great Seljuk Empire (Büyük Selçuklu Devleti)
- Imperial
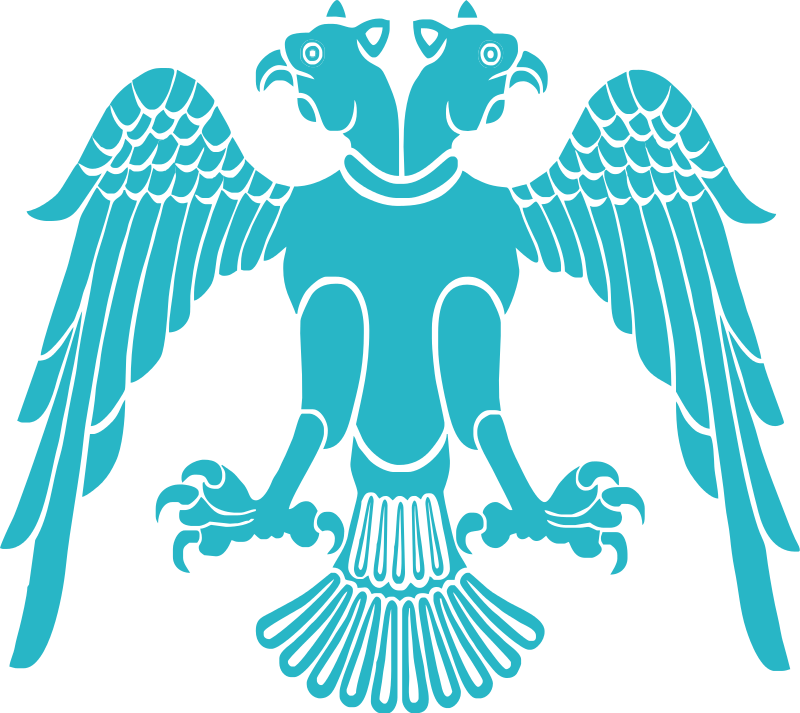
- Coat of Arms of the Great Seljuk Empire

Details
- Style: Sultan, Sultan of Sultans, Shahanshah
- First monarch: Toghrul I
- Last monarch: Toghrul III
- Formed: 1037
- Abolished: 1194
- Residence: Capital(s) of the Great Seljuk Empire

This is a list of sultans of the Seljuk Empire (1037–1194).

== List of sultans ==
No.	Image	Name	Reign	Life details
1		Toghrul I رکن الدین ابوطالبْ محمد طغرل بن میکائیل; Rukn ad-Dīn Abū Ṭālib Muḥammad Ṭughril ibn Mīkāʾīl	1037 – 4 October 1063 (~26 years)	993 – 4 October 1063 (aged 70): First Seljuk sultan; removed Buyids from Baghdad and became overlord of the Abbasid caliphs.
2		Alp Arslan ضياء الدين عضد الدولة محمد ألب أرسلان بن داود چغري; Ḍiyāʾ ad-Dīn ʿAḍud ad-Dawla Muḥammad Alp Arslān ibn Dāwūd Chaghrī	4 October 1063 – 15 December 1072 (~9 years)	20 January 1029 – 24 November 1072 (aged 43): Nephew of Toghrul; Defeated the Byzantines at Manzikert (1071); Assassinated
3		Malik-Shah I معز الدین جلال الدولة حسن ملک شاه بن آلپ ارسلان; Muʿizz ad-Dīn Jalāl ad-Dawla Ḥasan Malik-Shāh ibn Alp Arslān	15 December 1072 – 19 November 1092 (~20 years)	16 August 1055 – 19 November 1092 (aged 37): Son of Alp Arslan
4		Mahmud I ناصر الدین محمود بن ملک شاه; Nāṣir ad-Dīn Maḥmūd ibn Malik-Shāh	19 November 1092 – October 1094 (~2 years)	1088 – October 1094 (aged 5–6): Infant son of Malik Shah I; his mother Terken Khatun ruled as regent
5		Barkiyaruq رکن الدین ابوالمظفر برکیارق بن ملک شاه; Rukn ad-Dīn Abū'l-Muẓaffar Barkiyāruq ibn Malik-Shāh	1094 – 1105 (~11 years)	1079 or 1080 – 1105 (aged 25): Son of Malik Shah I; Fought civil wars against rival Seljuk princes; Died of tuberculosis
6		Malik-Shah II معز الدین ملک شاه بن برکیارق; Muʿizz ad-Dīn Malik-Shāh ibn Barkiyāruq	22 December 1104 – 13 February 1105 (~2 months)	Infant son of Barkiyaruq; Deposed and killed by Muhammad I Tapar
7		Muhammad I غیاث الدین محمد تاپار بن ملک شاه; Ghiyāth ad-Dīn Muḥammad Tapar ibn Malik-Shāh	13 February 1105 – 18 April 1118 (~13 years)	20 January 1082 – 18 April 1118 (aged 36): Son of Malik Shah I; Last Seljuk ruler with strong authority in the western realm
8		Ahmad Sanjar معز الدین عضد الدولة ابوالحارث احمد سنجر بن ملک شاه; Muʿizz ad-Dīn ʿAḍud ad-Dawla Abū'l-Ḥārith Aḥmad Sanjar ibn Malik-Shāh	18 April 1118 – 8 May 1157 (~39 years)	6 November 1086 – 8 May 1157 (aged 70): Son of Malik Shah I; succeeded Muhammad I as ruler of Khorasan. Last Seljuk ruler in the East and the senior sultan over the sultans in west, Lost lands beyond Syr Darya at Qatwan (1141); Captured by the Oghuz from 1153 to 1156.
9		Mahmud II مغیث الدین جلال الدولة محمود بن محمد; Mughīth ad-Dīn Jalāl ad-Dawla Maḥmūd ibn Muḥammad	18 April 1118 – 11 September 1131 (~13 years)	c. 1104 – 11 September 1131 (aged ~27): Son of Muhammad I; succeeded him as ruler of Iraq and western Iran
10		Dawud مغیث الدین ابوالفتح داود بن محمود; Mughīth ad-Dīn Abū'l-Fatḥ Dāwūd ibn Maḥmūd	11 September 1131 – 1132 (~1 year)	1115 or 1117 – 1142 or 1143 (aged 26–28): Son of Mahmud II; Overthrown by his uncle Toghrul II; Reinstated in Baghdad in 1136
11		Tughril II رکن الدین ابوطالب طغرل بن محمد; Rukn ad-Dīn Abū Ṭālib Ṭughril ibn Muḥammad	1132 – 24 October 1134 (~2 years)	c. 1109 – 24 October 1134 (aged ~25): Son of Muhammad I; Held power with the backing of his uncle Sanjar; Died of illness on arriving at Hamadan
12		Masud غیاث الدین ابوالفتح مسعود بن محمد; Ghiyāth ad-Dīn Abū'l-Fatḥ Masʿūd ibn Muḥammad	24 October 1134 – 10 October 1152 (~18 years)	c. 1107 – 10 October 1152 (aged 44–45): Son of Muhammad I; Defeated and captured al-Mustarshid (1135)
13		Malik-Shah III مغیث الدین ملک شاه بن محمود; Mughīth ad-Dīn Malik-Shāh ibn Maḥmūd	10 October 1152 – April 1153 (~6 months)	c. 1128 – 25 March 1160 (aged ~32): Son of Mahmud II; Deposed by his brother Muhammad II
14		Muhammad II رکن الدین محمد بن محمود; Rukn ad-Dīn Muḥammad ibn Maḥmūd	1153 – 1159 (~6 years)	April 1128 – December 1159 or January 1160 (aged 31): Son of Mahmud II; Deposed his brother Malik-Shah III
15		Suleiman-Shah معز الدین ابوالحارث سلیمان‌شاه بن محمد; Muʿizz ad-Dīn Abū'l-Ḥārith Sulaymān-Shāh ibn Muḥammad	1159 – 1160 (~1 year)	October/November 1117 – 13 March 1161 (aged 43): Son of Muhammad I; Installed with the support of Qutb ad-Din Mawdud of Mosul; Murdered in Hamadan
16		Arslan-Shah رکن الدین ابوالمظفر ارسلان‌شاه بن طغرل; Rukn ad-Dīn Abū'l-Muẓaffar Arslan-Shāh ibn Ṭughril	1160 – 1176 (~16 years)	c. 1133 – 1176 (aged 42–43): Son of Toghrul II; Installed by the atabeg Eldiguz, who held real power
17		Toghrul III رکن الدین طغرل بن ارسلان‌شاه; Rukn ad-Dīn Ṭughril ibn Arslan-Shāh; 1st reign	1176 – 1191 (~15 years)	1168 or 1169 – 19 March 1194 (aged ~25): Deposed by Qizil Arslan in 1191
18		Qizil Arslan مظفر الدین قزل ارسلان عثمان بن ایلدگز; Muẓaffar ad-Dīn Qizil Arslān ʿUthmān ibn Ildegiz	1191 (<1 year)	d. September 1191: Eldiguzid atabeg; usurped Toghrul III
(17)		Toghrul III رکن الدین طغرل بن ارسلان‌شاه; Rukn ad-Dīn Ṭughril ibn Arslan-Shāh	1192 – 19 March 1194 (~2 years)	1168 or 1169 – 19 March 1194 (aged ~25): Killed near Rey in battle against Khwarazmshah Tekish

== See also ==
- List of kings of Persia
- List of Seljuk sultans of Rûm
