= Abu'l-Qasim Darguzini =

Persian bureaucrat of the Seljuk Empire

Abu'l-Qasim Darguzini, commonly known as Darguzini (also spelled Dargazini; died August 1133) was a Persian bureaucrat and one of the leading figures of the Seljuk Empire in the early 12th century.

== Biography ==
Of local peasant origin, Darguzini was from the village Anasabad in Persian Iraq, and was thus also known as al-Anasabadi. However, he connected himself to the adjacent town of Darguzin due its prestige and importance. Nothing is known about the life of Darguzini before his administrative career, except that he was educated in the capital Isfahan. His aspirations and schemes led to his rise within the Seljuk administration, gaining the office of ariz al-jaysh (head of the military department). In 1124, he became vizier of the Seljuk sultan of Iraq and western Iran, Mahmud II (r. 1118–1131), thus succeeding Shams al-Mulk Uthman, a son of the prominent vizier Nizam al-Mulk. Darguzini was defamed by his rival Anushirvan ibn Khalid for his low-class background, hostility to Turkic military commanders, and supposed tenderness toward the Isma'ilis. Due to the efforts of Anushirvan, Darguzini was dismissed as vizier in 1127, but was later restored to his post, serving in 1128–1131. After he was dismissed a second time, Darguzini convinced the principal Seljuk sultan Ahmad Sanjar (r. 1118–1157) to appoint him as the vizier of Mahmud's brother Tughril, who temporarily ruled Azerbaijan, before becoming sultan (as Tughril II) of Iraq in 1132.

== Sources ==
- Bosworth, Clifford Edmund (1968). "The Political and Dynastic History of the Iranian World (A.D. 1000–1217)". In Boyle, John Andrew (ed.). The Cambridge History of Iran. Vol. 5. Cambridge: Cambridge University Press. pp. 1–202. ISBN 0-521-06936-X.
- Bosworth, C. Edmund (1994). "Dargazīnī". In Yarshater, Ehsan (ed.). Encyclopædia Iranica. Vol. VII/1: Dārā(b)–Dastūr al-Afāżel. London and New York: Routledge & Kegan Paul. pp. 33–34. ISBN 978-1-56859-019-6.
- Peacock, A. C. S. (2015). The Great Seljuk Empire. Edinburgh University Press. pp. 1–378. ISBN 978-0-7486-3826-0.
- Shoarian-Sattari, Naser; Rezaee, Maryam; Negahban, Farzin (2008). "Abū al-Qāsim al-Dargazīnī". In Madelung, Wilferd; Daftary, Farhad (eds.). Encyclopaedia Islamica Online. Brill Online. ISSN 1875-9831.
- Tetley, Gillies (2008). The Ghaznavid and Seljuk Turks: Poetry as a Source for Iranian History. Routledge. ISBN 978-1-134-08438-8.

Preceded by Shams al-Mulk Uthman	Vizier of Seljuk Sultanate of Iraq and western Iran; 1124–1127	Succeeded by Anushirvan ibn Khalid
