= Amira Khatun =

Wife of Abbasid caliph al-Mustarshid

Wife of the Abbasid caliph
- Tenure: 1124 – 1130s
- Born: 1110s Merv, Seljuk Sultanate
- Died: 1130s Baghdad/Merv
- Spouse: al-Mustarshid (until his death 1135)
Names
- Khatun bint Ahmad Sanjar
- House: Seljuk
- Father: Ahmad Sanjar
- Religion: Sunni Islam

Amira Khatun (Persian: امیره خاتون) was a Seljuk princess, daughter of sultan Ahmad Sanjar and the principal wife of Abbasid caliph al-Mustarshid.

== Background ==
Amira Khatun belongs to the Seljuk dynasty that ruled Eastern Islamic world in the name of caliph as Sultanate.

Her father was the son of Seljuk sultan Malik Shah I and his mother was Tajuddin Safariyya Khatun Her uncle was sultan Muhammad I Tapar.

== Life ==
Amira Khatun was the daughter of Seljuk sultan Ahmad Sanjar. Amira Khatun was born in Khorasan in the 1110s. Her exact date of birth is unknown.

Amira Khatun spent her childhood in Merv with her sister. During her father's reign all her sisters were married to important Seljuk figures. She was married to Abbasid caliph al-Mustarshid in 1124. Due to her marriage with al-Mustarshid bi'llah she also became known as Mustarshidi Khatun. She left the Seljuk harem and entered the Caliph's Harem and became principal and only wife of the caliph. Living a secluded life in the harem, only a few things are known about her. Her husband was busy with his government affairs. He also had political disagreement with her cousin and brother-in law, husband of her sister Gawhar Khatun; Ghiyath ad-Din Mas'ud.

Her husband, al-Mustarshid launched a military campaign against Seljuk sultan Mas'ud, who had obtained the title in Baghdad in January 1133 by the caliph himself. The rival armies met near Hamadan. The caliph, deserted by his troops, was taken prisoner, and pardoned on the promising not to quit his caliphal palace. Left in caliphal tent, however, in the sultan's absence, he was found assassinated while reading the Quran, as is supposed, by an emissary of the Shia Assassins, who had no love for the caliph and Sunni Muslim leaders. She probably died before her husband or few years after her husband's death.

== Sources ==
- Lambton, A.K.S. (1988). Continuity and Change in Medieval Persia. Bibliotheca Persica. Bibliotheca Persica. pp. 259–60, 268. ISBN 978-0-88706-133-2.
- Massignon, Louis (1982). The Passion of al-Hallaj, Mystic and Martyr of Islam. Vol. 2. Translated by Mason, Herbert. Princeton University Press.
- Safi, Omid (2006). The Politics of Knowledge in Premodern Islam: Negotiating Ideology and Religious Inquiry. University of North Carolina Press.
