= Shihab al-Islam =

Persian religious scholar

Shihab al-Islam Abu'l-Mahasin Abd al-Razzaq, commonly known as Shihab al-Islam, was a Persian religious scholar and jurist, who served as the vizier of the Seljuk sultan Ahmad Sanjar (r. 1118–1157) from April 1118 until his death in March 1121. He was the son of Abu'l-Qasim Abdullah, the brother of the distinguished vizier Nizam al-Mulk (died 1092).

== Sources ==
- Tetley, Gillies (2008). The Ghaznavid and Seljuk Turks: Poetry as a Source for Iranian History. Routledge. ISBN 978-1-134-08438-8.
