= Suleiman of the Seljuk Empire =

Sultan of the Seljuk Empire from 1159 to 1160

Suleiman-Shah

Sultan of the Seljuq Empire
- Reign: 1159–1160
- Predecessor: Muhammad II
- Successor: Arslan-Shah
- Born: October–November 1117
- Died: 13 March 1161 (aged: 44); Hamadan
- Spouse: Abkhaziyya Khatun
- Issue: Sanjar-Shah
Names
- Ghiyath ad-Dunya wa ad-Din Suleiman-Shah
- House: House of Seljuq
- Father: Muhammad I
- Mother: Gowhar Khatun
- Religion: Islam

Mu'izz al-Dunya wa'l-Din Abu'l-Harith Suleiman-Shah bin Muhammad (October–November 1117 – 13 March 1161; Persian: سلیمان شاه), was sultan of the Seljuq Empire from 1159 to 1160.

== Early life ==
Suleiman-Shah was the son of sultan Muhammad I Tapar. His mother was Gowhar Khatun the daughter of Isma'il bin Yaquti. His three brothers Mahmud II, Toghrul II and Mas'ud became the Sultans of the Seljuk Empire. He was formerly with his uncle, Sultan Sanjar, who had made him heir apparent and put his name in the Khutbah on the pulpits of Khurasan. After Sanjar had endured from the Oghuz, Suleiman-Shah took the command of the Khurasan army, although they proved too weak to deal with the Oghuz, Suleiman-Shah went to Khwarazm Shah, who married him to the daughter of his brother Aqsis. In 1152 after the accession of Sultan Muhammad, Suleiman-Shah along with others attacked Muhammad and he was granted the title "Al-Melil al-Mustadir" by the caliph. He was proclaimed sultan at Baghdad in 1156/57, but was later defeated by Muhammad.

== Travel to Hamadhan ==
On 12 January 1160, Suleiman-Shah traveled from Mosul to Hamadhan. The reason he went to Hamadhan was that after the death of Prince Muhammad, son of Sultan Mahmud, the great emirs sent to Atabeg Qutb ad-Din Mawdud, lord of Mosul, requesting him to send them Prince Suleiman-Shah, so that they could invest him the sultanate. An agreement was settled between them that Suleiman-Shah should be the Sultan, Qutb ad-Din Mawdud his atabeg, that Jamal al-Din, Qutb ad-Din Mawdud's, vizier should be the vizier for Suleiman-Shah and Zayn al-Din Ali, the emir of the Mosul forces, should be commander of Suleiman-Shah's army. They all swore to accept this and Suleiman-Shah was equipped with large sums of money, campaign baggage, mounts, sovereign regalia and such like items fit for the sultan. He them sent out for Hamadhan with Zayn al-Din leading the Mosul army.

When they drew near the uplands, troops came to join them in droves, a group and an emir meeting them every day, until a large force was gathered around Suleiman-Shah. Zayn al-Din thought them a threat to himself because he saw they had such sway over the sultan and showed such lack of respect as made his anxiety unavoidable. He therefore returned to Mosul. When he went back and left Suleiman-Shah, plans did not work out and he failed to achieve what he wished. The army arrested him at the gates of Hamadhan in October 1160 and made the Khutbah for Arslan-Shah, son of Sultan Tughril II, whose mother was married by Eldiguz.

== Accession and death ==
Suleiman-Shah succeeded Sultan Muhammad after his death in January 1159 and received from Baghdad the title "Sultan Muizz ad-Din Suleiman Shah Burhan-Amir al-Muminin". But in September 1160 he was deposed after reigning for twenty months. He was held as a captive by Qutb ad-Din Mawdud until 1160 and was murdered on 13 March 1161 in the castle of Ala al-Dawla in Hamadan, and was buried in the tomb of his brother Sultan Ghiyath ad-Din Mas'ud.

== Family ==
One of his wives was the daughter of Aqsis, the brother of the Khwarazm Shah. Another wife was the sister of his hajib Yusuf Inal Tegin Khwarazm Shah. She was a forceful woman who dominated her husband. Another wife was Abkhaziyya Khatun. She was a daughter of King Demetrius I of Georgia. had been formerly married to his brother Sultan Ghiyath ad-Din Mas'ud, and his uncle Sultan Ahmad Sanjar. He had one son named Sanjar-Shah.

== Bibliography ==
- Ibn Al-Athir (2010). The Chronicle of Ibn Al-Athir for the Crusading Period from Al-Kamil Fi'l-Ta'rikh. Ashgate Publishing, Ltd. ISBN 978-0-754-66951-7.

== Succession ==
Preceded by Muhammad II	Sultan of Great Seljuq; 1159–1160	Succeeded by Arslan-Shah
