= Alp Arslan ibn Mahmud =

Alp Arslan ibn Mahmud was ruler of Mosul from 1127 to 1146. As son of Mahmud II, he was appointed governor of Mosul in 1127 with Zengi as his atabeg. While governor in name only, Alp aspired to replace Ghiyath ad-Din Mas’ud as sultan upon his death. In 1145, Alp conspired to kill Zengi's deputy Naşīr al-Dīn Jaqar and take control of Mosul. His co-conspirator was likely Farrukh-Shāh ibn Mahmūd, who provided assurances that the army would support Alp. Naşīr was killed by Alp, Farrukh or their followers (according to different sources), and his head thrown for effect towards Zengi's forces. Qadi Taj al-Din Yahya ibn Shahrazuri encouraged Alp to take control of the citadel at Mosul, escorting him there, where he and his followers were arrested by Zengi loyalists. Zengi dispatched his commander Zain-ad-Din ‘Ali Küchük to control the situation. The conspirators were executed and Alp was kept close to Zengi until his death in 1146. Alp Arslan was then replaced by Zengi's son Saif ad-Din Ghazi I who had him imprisoned.
