= Anushirvan ibn Khalid =

Persian vizier of Later Abbasids and Seljuqs

Sharaf al-Din Anushirvan ibn Khalid

Abbasid Vizier
- In office 1132 – 1134
- Monarch: Al-Mustarshid

Seljuk Vizier
- In office 1135 – 1136
- Monarch: Ghiyath ad-Din Mas'ud
- In office 1127 – 1128
- Monarch: Mahmud II
- Preceded by: Abu'l-Qasim Darguzini
- Succeeded by: Abu'l-Qasim Darguzini

Personal details
- Born: c. 1066/7 Ray, Iran
- Died: c. 1137/1139 Iran
- Spouse: unknown
- Children: Nasr (son)
- Parent: Khalid ibn Muhammad
- Relatives: Muhammad Kashani (grandfather)
- Military career
- Allegiance: Seljuqs
- Service years: 1105/6–1110s
- Rank: Head of Military

Anushirvan ibn Khalid ibn Muhammad Kashani (Persian: انوشیروان بن خالد بن محمد کاشانی), also known as Abu Nasr Sharaf al-Din, was a Persian statesman and historian, who served as the vizier of the Seljuq Empire and the Abbasid Caliphate.

Anushirvan was born in 1066/7 at Ray; he belonged to a Twelver Shia family which had origins in Kashan. He was a treasurer and head of the Seljuq military during the reign of Sultan Muhammad I. Anushirvan was later succeeded by Shams al-Mulk Uthman as head of the Seljuq military. After this, Anushirvan went to Baghdad, where he later became head of the Seljuq military once again. He was shortly appointed by Mahmud II as his vizier in 1127, and remained in that office until 1128. Anushirvan served as the vizier of the Abbasid caliph al-Mustarshid from 1132 to 1134, and then briefly as the vizier of the new Seljuq Sultan Ghiyath ad-Din Mas'ud from 1135 to 1136. Anushirvan later died between 1137 and 1139.

== Sources ==
- Bosworth, C. E. (1968). "The Political and Dynastic History of the Iranian World (A.D. 1000–1217)". In Frye, R. N. (ed.). The Cambridge History of Iran, Volume 5: The Saljuq and Mongol periods. Cambridge: Cambridge University Press. pp. 1–202. ISBN 978-0-521-06936-6.
- Bosworth, C. Edmund (1986). "ANŪŠERVĀN KĀŠĀNĪ". ANŪŠERVĀN KĀŠĀNĪ – Encyclopaedia Iranica. Encyclopaedia Iranica, Vol. II, Fasc. 2. C. Edmund Bosworth. p. 139.
