= Tarken Khatun =

Tarken Khatun or Terken Khatun may refer to:

- Terken Khatun (wife of Ala ad-Din Tekish)
- Terken Khatun (wife of Malik-Shah I)
- Terken Khatun (wife of Il-Arslan)
- Terken Khatun (wife of Ahmad Sanjar)
