= Daughter of Joseph of Baghdad =

Personal life
- Parent(s): Joseph, "son of the physician"
- Known for: Jewish mystic and messianic claimant in Baghdad, c. 1121

Religious life
- Religion: Judaism
- Denomination: Rabbinic Judaism

Senior posting
- Period in office: early 12th century
- Residence: Baghdad, Abbasid Caliphate

The Daughter of Joseph of Baghdad (early 12th-century) was a Jewish mystic active in Baghdad in c.1121. She was the daughter of "Joseph, the son of the physician". The only source of information about her comes from a letter, written for a recipient living in the Egyptian city of Fustat soon after the events it describes. The story of the daughter was written on the back of a deed.

The letter relates that when Al-Mustarshid (r. 1118–1135), the Abbasid caliph, imposed laws on the Jews instructing them to once more wear special clothing, which they refused to wear, the male Jews of Baghdad were all imprisoned. The daughter of Joseph, an ascetic, claimed to have a vision of the prophet Elijah, and the Jewish community declared her to be the Messiah. The Caliph threatened to have her burned at the stake, but reconsidered after having a dream that he interpreted as a sign against this. He instead released his prisoners and retracted plans to increase the taxes of the Jews.

== Sources ==
- Taitz, Emily; Henry, Sondra; Tallan, Cheryl· (2003). The JPS Guide to Jewish Women: 600 B.C.E.to 1900 C.E. Philadelphia: Jewish Publication Society. p. 56. ISBN 978-08276-0-752-1.
