= Suleiman I =

Suleiman I may refer to:

- Suleiman-Shah (d. 1161), sultan of the Seljuk Empire
- Suleiman ibn Qutulmish (d. 1086), founder of the Sultanate of Rum
- Süleyman Çelebi (1377–1411), co-ruler of the Ottoman Empire
- Suleiman the Magnificent (1494–1566), 10th sultan of the Ottoman Empire
- Suleiman I of Persia (1648–1694), 8th shah of the Safavid Empire

== See also ==
- Suleiman
