= Gohar Khatun =

Wife of sultan Muhammad I Seljuk

Gohar Khatun گوهر خاتون
- Seljuk royal consort
- Spouse: Muhammad I Tapar
- Father: Ismail bin Yaquti
- Religion: Islam

Gohar Khatun (Persian: گوهر خاتون) was 11th century Seljuk royal consort who was the daughter of Ismail bin Yaquti and the wife of Sultan Muhammad I Seljuk. She was a described as having exercised political influence. She reportedly swayed the appointment of viziers, and the legitimacy of the highest administrative office was said to have depended on her confirmation. She had significant influence in appointments and dismissals. For example, Kamal al-Mulk is described as attaining prominence at Sultan Muhammad's court through her support. In some accounts, Gohar Khatun and Kamal al-Mulk cooperated to depose Abu Mansur Mibdi, a vizier of Sultan Muhammad.

== Life ==
Gohar Khatun exercised significant influence. Some sources describe her as having her own divan. Two ministers associated with her divan are Amir Amid and Kamal al-Mulk (also reported as later using the name Boulqasim Ans Abadi). Over time, Kamal al-Mulk reportedly gained influence with Gohar Khatun and replaced Amir Amid. She is described as viewing Kamal al-Mulk as more competent and experienced than Amir Amid.

The minister of her divan, Kamal al-Mulk Samirimi, was appointed to the position after organizing the department's structure and following the death of a previous minister. Gohar Khatun reportedly introduced him to the sultan, after which he was appointed to offices described as Meshref al-Mulk and later Meshref. One account states that in 512 AH (1118 CE) he became the prime minister of Sultan Mahmud bin Malik Shah.

When Amir Amid requested Kamal al-Mulk’s removal, Gohar Khatun is reported to have threatened to order Amir Amid’s dismissal if necessary and to have warned Kamal al-Mulk of a possible attempt on his life. She requested that the sultan assign the troops of Azerbaijan to her service She is also described as changing her minister three times, which is presented as evidence of her influence. In addition, she is said to have consulted her father, Ismail bin Yaquti, regarding the loyalty of Azerbaijani soldiers (linked to the payment of their salaries), and the sultan is reported to have confirmed this arrangement by special decree.

Gohar Khatun owned land in Semiran, Isfahan, and is described as collecting taxes from it for herself.

Gohar Khatun participated in Seljuk administration through the "Khatuni Divan", an office established to manage her lands and estates. Abu Tahr Khatuni served under her and received the title "Khatuni" from this association.

== Fall from power and death ==
When Sultan Muhammad fell ill, some accounts claim those around him blamed Gohar Khatun’s sorcery or magic for his illness, demanded her imprisonment, and that she died in prison by suffocation. Another explanation given for the conspiracy against her is that she had imprisoned prominent figures and emirs, provoking fear and opposition that contributed to her death.

== Bibliography ==
- Nasawi (1953). سیرت جلال الدین منکبرنی (تصحیح مجتبی مینوی) [Biography of Jalaluddin Mankabarani (edited by Mojtaba Minovi)] (in Persian). Tehran: انتشارات علمی و فرهنگی.
- Bundārī (1246). تاریخ سلسله سلجوقی [History of the Seljuk Dynasty] (in Persian).
- Yazdi, Ahmad ibn Hussain Katib (1357). تاریخ جدید یزد [New History of Yazd] (in Persian).
- Rawandi (1205). راحة الصدور وآية السرور في تاريخ الدولة السلجوقية [Comfort of Hearts and Sign of Joy in the History of the Seljuk State] (in Persian).
- Hosseini, Akram; Zavar, Nazanin (November 2024). Empire builders: Tracing the urban footprints of Seljuk women from Khorasan to Anatolia.
- Lambton, Ann (1984). سیری در تاریخ ایران بعد از اسلام (in Persian).
- İnce, Fatma (2021-05-27). "Heraldic women in the internal policy of the Great Seljuk State". Karadeniz Uluslararası Bilimsel Dergi. 50.
- al-Hasani, Zahraa Mohsen Hassan (2011-01-01). االأميرات السلجوقيات ودورهن لسياسي والعسكري حتى سنة 500ه [Seljuk princesses and their role in the political and military until the year 500H] (Thesis) (in Arabic). جامعة المثنى، كلية التربية.
- Razi, Shams al-Din Muhammad ibn Qays (1959). الْمُعْجَمِ فِي مَعايير اشعارِ الْعَجَمِ (in Arabic).
