= Arslan-Shah (Seljuk sultan) =

Seljuk sultan r. 1160–1177

Arslan Shah Rukn al-Din
- Abu al-Muzaffar
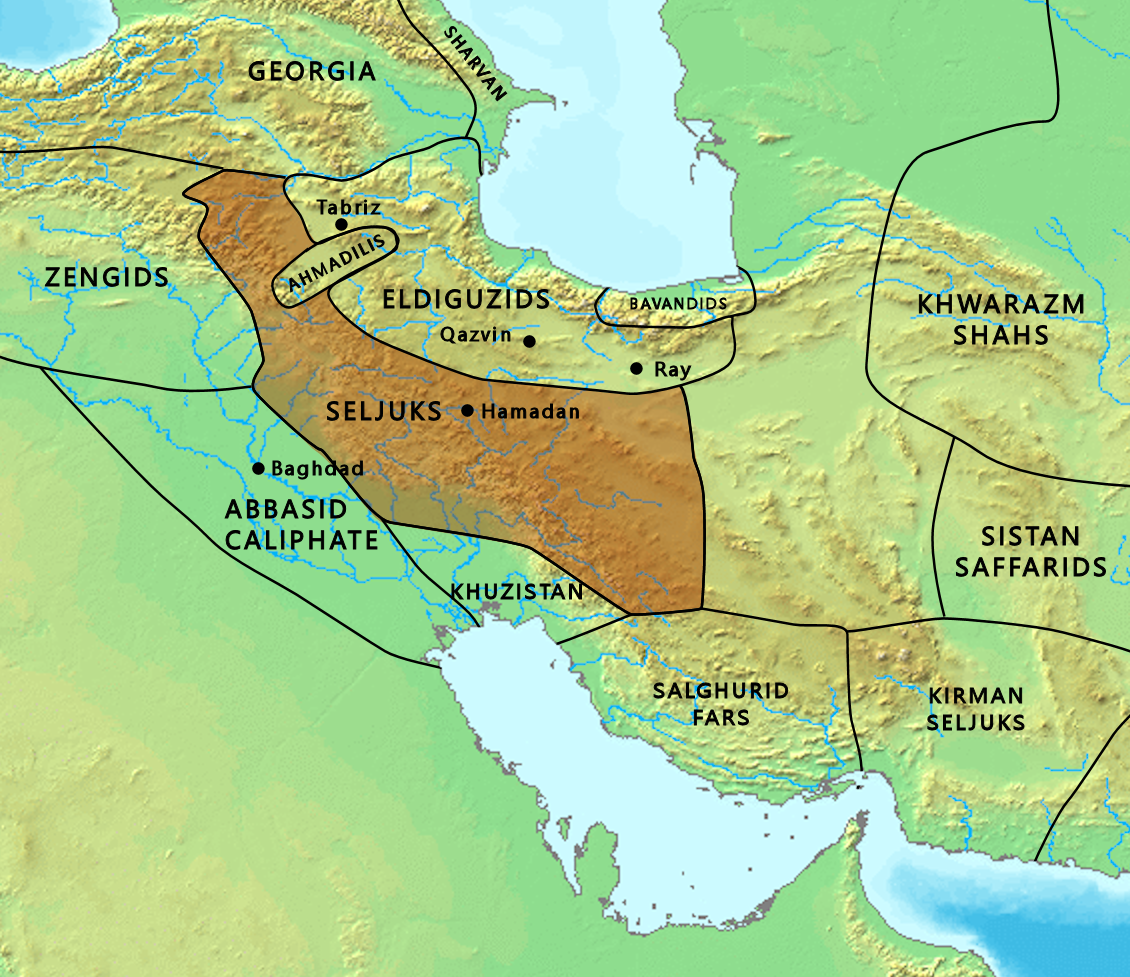
- The Seljuk domain in 1170s and 1180s

Sultan of the Seljuk Empire
- Reign: 1160–1176
- Predecessor: Suleiman-Shah
- Successor: Toghrul III
- Born: 1133
- Died: 1176 (aged 42–43)
- Spouse: Kerman Khatun; Mahd Rafi Khatun; Sitti Fatima
- Issue: Toghrul III
- Father: Tughril II
- Mother: Mumina Khatun
- Religion: Sunni Islam

Rukn al-Din Abu al-Muzaffar Arslan Shah Ibn Tughril II (1133–1176) was a Seljuk sultan who appointed as ruler of Iraq and Persia. His reign lasted fifteen years and seven months. His reign was distinguished by the influence and dominance of the prince and founder of the Atabeg of Azerbaijan, “Shams al-Din Eldiguz,” after the death of Arslan's father. Shah, his mother, Momina Hatun, married Eldiguz, and his uncle, Sultan Masoud, took care of him. In 1160, Shams al-Din declared Arslan Shah installed as ruler of the Seljuk Sultanate in Iraq.

Eldiguz participated in the princes of the Seljuk state in their struggle to reach the position of the Sultanate more than once, and he supported one party over the other, and his contribution to these struggles had a great impact on the arrival of his stepson, Arslan bin Tughrul bin Muhammad, to the position of Seljuk Sultan in Persia and Iraq. So Arslan kept Atabeg Eldiguz in Hamadan (the capital of Seljuk Iraq) and appointed his maternal brother, Muhammad Jahan Bahlawan bin Eldiguz, as his chamberlain. Eldiguz's influence remained strong until his death in 1172 (568 AH), and Sultan Arslan had nothing but his name to be addressed on the pulpits and his name would be struck.

Important political decisions were made by Prince Eldiguz and Arslan Shah was practically under the monarchy. However, Arslan Shah, with the help of Amir Eldiguz, managed to avoid the events and developments that occurred during his reign, including the Georgian invasion plots of Muslim lands and the Georgian seizure of Azerbaijan, the struggle against the Ismailis and the occupation of their fortresses. Which led to the relative stability of the foundations of the Seljuk government during the reign of Arslan Shah.

== Life ==
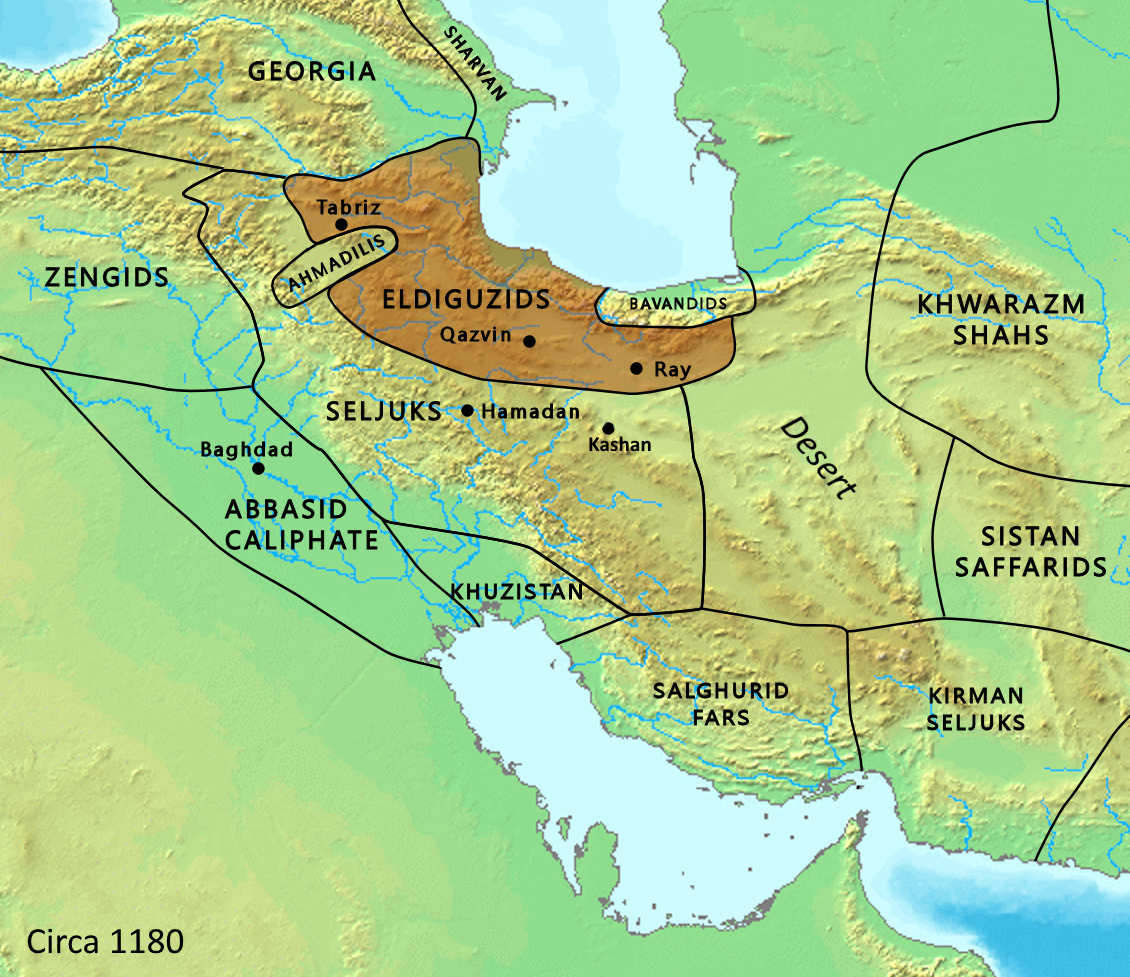
Eldiguzids territory in 1180, that broke off from the Seljuks

Shams al-Din became the atabeg of Arslan Shah bin Tughrul and was given the rule of the Arran region in the year 541 AH/1146 AD. He began to expand his influence in the neighboring regions and seized most of Azerbaijan, the mountains, Hamadan, Isfahan, and Ray, and made Tabriz his capital. Eldiguz's influence was strong because he was the Sultan's Atabeg and the ruler of Azerbaijan, and he controlled all the state's facilities. He was able, with his competence, good management, and the assistance of his two sons, Muhammad Jahan Pahlawan and Muzaffar al-Din Uthman Qazil Arslan, to repel the plots of the enemies and defeat them. He added that he married his son Muhammad Jahan Pahlawan to the daughter of the ruler of Ray.

Before Arslan Shah's rule, Sultan Muhammad was worried after Al-Muqtafi Al-Abbasi had grown in power, and he gathered with his supporters and launched an attack on Baghdad. The imprisoned Seljuk princes were released, and Arslan Shah was leading the march among the army. However, the Seljuk Sultanate in Iraq was defeated by Al-Muqtafi's army. After the death of Sultan Muhammad, civil wars broke out in the Seljuk Sultanate in Iraq. In turn, Shams al-Din Eldiguz installed Arslan Shah on the throne of the Iraqi Sultanate. In November 1160, Eldiguz entered the city of Hamadan with Arslan Shah at the head of an army of 20,000. They were welcomed by all the nobles and princes of the state, and Hamadan was declared the ruling sultan of Iraq. Shams al-Din Eldiguz earned the title of “The Great Atabeg” and effectively took control of the Seljuk Sultanate in Iraq. The eldest son, Mehmet Jahan Pahlawan, became the Sultan's chamberlain, and the youngest son, Gisel Arslan, was appointed commander-in-chief of the army.

=== Arslan Shah and the Abbasid Caliph Al-Mustanjid Billah ===
However, the situation was not good between the Abbasid Caliph and Arslan Shah, so Eldiguz sent a representative to Baghdad and asked the Abbasid Caliph Al-Mustanjed to deliver the sermon in the name of Arslan Shah in Iraq, but he left Baghdad with a black face, and the Caliph united with other rulers against Arslan Shah and his Atabegs.

=== Arslan Shah and the Ismailis ===
In the absence of Prince Arslan Shah and Eldiguz, the Ismailis rebuilt their fortresses in Qazvin when Atabeg Eldiguz and Sultan Arslan marched to suppress the Georgians. The Ismailis faced resistance from the people of Qazvin. After Arslan Shah returned from the war with the Georgians, people went to him and complained. Arslan Shah attacked fortresses to repel the Ismaili strife. During the four months of attacking the Ismailis, he dealt them heavy blows and was able to conquer and destroy the Ismaili fortresses.

=== Kerman ===
From 1167 to 1168, the ruler of Kerman, Tughrul Shah, died, and a power struggle began between his sons. The middle son fled to Hamadan and came to serve Sultan Arslan Shah and Shams al-Din Eldiguz. In 1168, Shams al-Din's forces entered Kerman. Arslan Shah II was appointed governor of Kerman, subordinate to Shah Atabeg.

== Death ==
When the news of Shams al-Din Eldiguz's death reached Jahan Pahlawan, he immediately departed from Hamadan to Nakhchivan, and seized the state treasury and the throne's possessions. He also gathered all the forces together and began to wait for the Sultan's attitude towards him. After Eldiguz died in 1175, the princes, dissatisfied with his policy, took advantage of Jahan's departure from Hamadan to incite Sultan Arslan Shah to attack Azerbaijan with a large army. But Sultan Arslan Shah invited Jahan to the capital, reconciled with him, and died shortly after handing over the administration of the state to him. According to the sources, Arslan Shah was poisoned on the orders of Jahan, and he installed Tughrul III, the 7-year-old son of Arslan Shah, on the Sultan's throne in 1177, and became his atabeg.

== Family ==
One of his wives was Kerman Khatun. She was the daughter of Abbasid Caliph Al-Muqtafi. She was a widow of his cousin, Sultan Muhammad II. They married in September 1160. Another wife was Mahd Rafi Khatun, also known as Kirmani Khatun. She was the daughter of Kirman Shah, son of Arslan Shah I. She was also a widow of Sultan Muhammad. They married in November 1160. Another wife was Sitti Fatima. She was the sister of Amir Sayyid Fakhr-ud-Din Ala-ud-Dawlah. They married on 17 December 1175, fourteen days before his death. He had one son, Toghrul III.

== See also ==
- Eldiguzids
