= Turkan Khatun (wife of Ahmad Sanjar) =

Terken Khatun
- Consort of the Seljuk sultan
- Died: April 1156; Merv
- Spouse: Ahmad Sanjar
Names
- Safvat al-Din Maryam Terken Khatun
- Father: Muhammad Arslan Afrasiyabi.
- Religion: Islam

Turkan Khatun, born Safvat al-Din Maryam, was the principal wife of the Seljuk ruler Sultan Sanjar. Turkan Khatun was a powerful and authoritative woman of the Seljuk era, and was one of the most influential and strongest women of the Seljuks.

== Biography ==
Safvat al-Din Maryam was the daughter of Arslan Khan Afrasiyabi. She a powerful woman who worked behind the scenes in directing state affairs, and her orders were obeyed throughout the Seljuk territories. During Sanjar’s reign and even before, Turkan Khatun managed state affairs and was unparalleled not only in governance and politics.

She was generous, and her kindness and charitable deeds were praised by poets such as Anvari. She was given the honorary titles of Ismat al-Din, Safwat al-Din Karimat al-Nisa’, and Raziya al-Din by several prominent 6th-century AH poets, and was also known as Turkan Khatun.

She was a popular figure, loved not only by Sultan Sanjar but also by the people, who often sought her help to solve their problems. The poet Anvari praised her generosity, benevolence, and noble character in several odes, praying to God for her long life and honor. The female poet Mahasti spent much time at Sultan Sanjar’s court and benefited from the patronage of Turkan Khatun, who paid great attention to poets.

She was called the "Queen on Earth" by Sanjar and by historians of her time for her virtue and beauty. Sanjar respected only her judgment in all state matters, and relied entirely on her.

Turkan Khatun was an influential figure, recognized for her power on the battlefield and her role in military campaigns. In 536 AH, when Sanjar was defeated by the Qara Khitais at the Qatwan plain, Turkan Khatun was taken captive by the Gurkhan, who kept her at his court. However, after one year, she was released upon the payment of 500,000 dinars.

She held a very special place in her husband’s heart—so great that when Sultan Sanjar’s power waned, and on 6 Jumada al-Awwal in 548 AH he and his wife were captured by the Ghaznavids near Merv, the king, fearing that his beloved wife might remain a captive of the Ghazis, refused to flee despite repeated opportunities for escape. He endured three and a half years under the harshest conditions until he witnessed the death of Turkan Khatun, after which he finally fled.

The death of Turkan Khatun gradually overwhelmed Sultan Sanjar, especially when he entered the city of Merv—his capital, which he had named Shahjahan—and found the once thriving and unparalleled city in ruins. He was deeply grief-stricken, and the following year, on 24 Rabiʽ al-Awwal, he died in Merv at the age of 82, after a reign of nearly 61 years, and was buried there.
