= Al-Mustarshid =

Abbasid caliph in Baghdad (r. 1118–1135)

Al-Mustarshid Billah المسترشد بالله
- Khalīfah; Amir al-Mu'minin
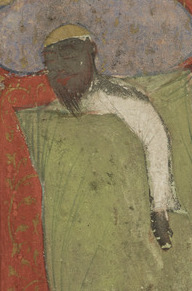
- Cropped Persian miniature of Al-Mustarshid Billah

29th Caliph of the Abbasid Caliphate Abbasid Caliph in Baghdad
- Reign: 6 August 1118 – 29 August 1135
- Predecessor: al-Mustazhir
- Successor: al-Rashid
- Born: April/May 1092; Baghdad, Abbasid Caliphate
- Died: 29 August 1135 (aged 43); Baghdad, Abbasid Caliphate
- Consort: Amira Khatun; Khushf
- Issue: al-Rashid; Alī al-Qabī
Names
- Abu Mansur al-Faḍl ibn Ahmad al-Mustazhir Al-Mustarshid bi'llah
Era name and dates
- Later Abbasid era: 12th century
- Dynasty: Abbasid
- Father: Al-Mustazhir
- Mother: Lubaba
- Religion: Sunni Islam

Abu Mansur al-Faḍl ibn Ahmad al-Mustazhir (Arabic: أبو منصور الفضل بن أحمد المستظهر; 1092 – 29 August 1135) better known by his regnal name Al-Mustarshid Billah (Arabic: المسترشد بالله) was the Abbasid caliph in Baghdad from 1118 to 1135. He was son of his predecessor, caliph al-Mustazhir. He succeeded his father in the year 1118 as the Abbasid caliph.

== Biography ==
=== Early life and personality ===
Al-Mustarshid was born in 1092. He was son of Caliph Al-Mustazhir. His mother was a Slavic concubine named Lubanah. She was from Baghdad. His was named Al-Fadl by his father. His full name was Al-Fadl ibn Ahmad al-Mustazhir and his Kunya was Abu Mansur. After the death of his father in 1118, he succeeded him as Caliph.

Physically, al-Mustarshid was a red-haired man with blue eyes and freckles.

=== Reign and conflicts with Seljuks and Dubays ibn Sadaqa ===
Al-Mustarshid achieved more independence as a ruler while the Seljuk sultan Mahmud II was engaged in war in the East.

Muhammad I Tapar died in 1118 and was succeeded as Seljuk sultan by his eldest son Mahmud II. It was not long before the new sultan's younger brother Mas'ud rebelled against him, joining forces with Dubays. In 1120, Aqsunqur al-Bursuqi, then a leading commander of the sultan's army, met Mas'ud and Dubays in battle in Azerbaijan, quelling the rebellion for the time being. Supporting al-Bursuqi was the young officer Zengi whose loyalty to the sultan would soon be rewarded.

An alliance was formed with the Artuqid Ilghazi, emir of Aleppo, by Dubays marrying his daughter Guhar Khatun. In 1121, their combined forces suffered a major defeat at the hand of David IV of Georgia at the Battle of Didgori, with the two commanders barely escaping with their lives. Ilghazi died in November 1122 and was succeeded at Aleppo by his son Timurtash under the regency of Belek Ghazi. Bad blood soon developed between Dubays and Aleppo's new leadership.

In 1122, Zengi was granted iqta' for the city of Wasit and placed in charge of the defense of Basra, likely at the request of the sultan, rewarding his loyalty. That same year, the caliph al-Mustarshid growing weary of Dubyas, installed al-Bursuqi as commander-in-chief (shinha) of Iraq and Baghdad. In the summer of 1122, al-Bursuqi was defeated by Dubyas and his Artuqid followers leading the sultan to call for jihad against the Mazyadid alliance. Mahmud ordered a military expedition from Mosul to southern Iraq, led by Zengi under the orders of al-Bursuqi, then commander-in-chief of the sultan's army. Zengi, in his first major military command, garrisoned his troops around Wasit, and then defeated Dubays' forces at the Battle of Mubarraqiyya in March 1123.

In 1122, al-Mustarshid deposed and imprisoned his vizier Amid al-dawla Jalal al-Din Hasan ibn Ali. Mahmud II then imposed Ahmad ibn Nizam al-Mulk as al-Mustarshid's vizier. Ahmad later fought against the Mazyadid chief Dubays ibn Sadaqa. Ahmad also fortified the walls around Baghdad.

During al-Mustarshid's caliphate, Baghdad was to some extent controlled militarily by Mahmud, who installed Ahmad ibn Nizam al-Mulk as the caliph's vizier. During a Seljuk shakeup in 1123, the caliph removed Ahmad from his position. Dubays tried to take advantage of this situation and, after plundering Bosra, attacked Baghdad together with the sultan's brother Mas’ud. They were however crushed by an army led by Zengi and Ahmad.

=== Reign after 1123 ===
One year later, Mahmud II removed Shams al-Mulk Uthman as his vizier, and had him executed. The Abbasid caliph then used this opportunity to get rid of Ahmad as his vizier. Ahmad then retired to a school founded by his father, the Nizamiyya of Baghdad, where he lived the last 25 years of his life, dying in 1149/1150.

In 1123, Banu Mazyad chieftain Dubays ibn Sadaqa tried to take advantage of the momentary lack of power and, after plundering Bosra, attacked Baghdad together with a young brother of the sultan, Ghiyath ad-Din Mas’ud (known as Mas'ud). He was however crushed by an army under Zengi and Ahmad ibn Nizam al-Mulk. During the same year, al-Mustarshid removed Ahmad ibn Nizam al-Mulk as his vizier. In 1125, it was the time of al-Mustarshid to rebel. He sent an army to take Wasit but was defeated near Baghdad and imprisoned in his palace the next year.

Wishing to contain Dubays ibn Sadaqa, in 1122 Mahmūd II ordered a military expedition from Mosul to southern Iraq, commanded by Zengi and Altun-Tash al-Aburi under the orders of Aqsunqur al-Bursuqi. Zengi, for whom this was the first major military command, garrisoned his troops around Wasit, and was granted Governorship of the region of Wasit as an ıqta. In alliance with the troops of the Caliphate, they defeated Dubays at the Battle of Mubarraqiyya in 1123. Zengi then received in addition to his previous responsibilities the Military Governorship of Basra in 1124.

In order to counter the ambitions of al-Mustarshid, who wanted to acquire world dominance, the Seljuks led by Mahmud II now waged a campaign against him. With some decisive leadership from Zengi, the Seljuks managed to take control of Baghdad and the Caliphate, pillaging the Caliph's palace. The Caliph sued for peace and had to pay a huge ransom. In addition to his possessions in Wasit and Basra, Zengi was promoted and received the Governorship for Baghdad in April 1126, receiving the title of shihna effectively putting him in control of the whole of Seljuk Iraq. In 1127, following the murder of Aqsunqur al-Bursuqi, Zengi was named Governor of Mosul, where the Atabegdom of Mosul was formed. Staying in Mosul until the death of Sultān Muhammad Tapar in 1118, Zangi then entered the service of the Sultān’s son and the new Seljuk ruler Mahmūd (1118–1119), remaining loyal to him to the end. With the new era introduced with the defeat of Sultān Mahmūd in the Sāveh battle he engaged his uncle Sanjar in 1119, which opened the way for Sanjar (1119–1157) to accede to the throne of Great Seljuk Empire, Mahmūd was assigned to the Iraqi Seljuk Sultānate (1119–1131), continuing his rule there. In 1124, Sultān Mahmūd granted the city of Wasit to Imad al-Din Zangi as a ıqta, and conferred him the Military Governorship of Basra together with Baghdad and Iraq in 1127. The reason behind such assignments was to attempt to impede caliph al-Mustarshid (1118–1135) who then wished to build a worldwide dominance. Indeed, the efforts of Zangi in the fight of Mahmūd, whom Sanjar urgently sent to Baghdad, against the Caliph ensured the Sultān became victorious, and he contributed to the efforts in damaging the sole authority and dominance claims of the Caliph. Following the deaths of Mosul Governor Aq-Sunqur el-Porsuqi and his successor and son Mas’ud in the same year in 1127, Zangi was appointed Governor of Mosul. He was also in charge of al-Jazeera and Northern Syria, and Sultān Mahmūd approved him being assigned as the Atabeg of his two sons, Farrukh shah and Alparsalan. Thus the Atabegdom of Mosul was formed.

After the death of Mahmud II, a civil war broke out in the Seljuk western territories. Zengi was recalled to the east by certain rebel members, stimulated by the caliph and Dubays. Both Dubays and Zengi were seeking a delicate balance between competing Seljuk potentates. At one point, Sanjar invited the two to invade Iraq and on 20 June 1132, they confronted the forces of al-Mustarshid at Fortress of Hisn al-Baramika, north of Baghdad. Despite having a superior force, the caliph prevailed and the expansion visions of Zengi and Dubays were shattered. Zengi was beaten and fled. The caliph pursued him to Mosul, and besieged him there but without success for three months. It was nonetheless a milestone in the revival of the military power of the caliphate. Al-Mustarshid appointment Anushirvan ibn Khalid as vizier, he remained in office from 1132 to 1134.

Zengi now resumed operations in Syria and, in 1134, laid siege to Damascus, but was induced, partly by the bravery of the enemy, partly at the instance of the caliph, to whom Zengi had made some concession in the public prayers, to relinquish the attempt. Recalled again by troubles in the east, he was unable to do much against the Crusaders till after al-Mustarshid's death.

== Family ==
Al-Mustarshid's only wife was Amira Khatun, the daughter of Seljuk sultan Ahmad Sanjar. They married in 1124. One of his concubines was Khushf. She was from Iraq, and was the mother of his son, Mansur, the future caliph Al-Rashid Billah. He had another son who died of smallpox in 1131 aged twenty one.

== Death and succession ==
=== Final years and assassination ===
Not long after the siege of Damascus, al-Mustarshid launched a military campaign against Seljuk sultan Mas'ud, who had obtained the title in Baghdad in January 1133 by the caliph himself. The rival armies met near Hamadan. The caliph, deserted by his troops, was taken prisoner, and pardoned on the promising not to quit his palace. Left in the caliphal tent, however, in the sultan's absence, he was found murdered while reading the Quran, as is supposed, by an emissary of the Assassins, who had no love for the caliph. Modern historians have suspected that Mas'ud instigated the murder although the two most important historians of the period Ibn al-Athir and Ibn al-Jawzi did not speculate on this matter.

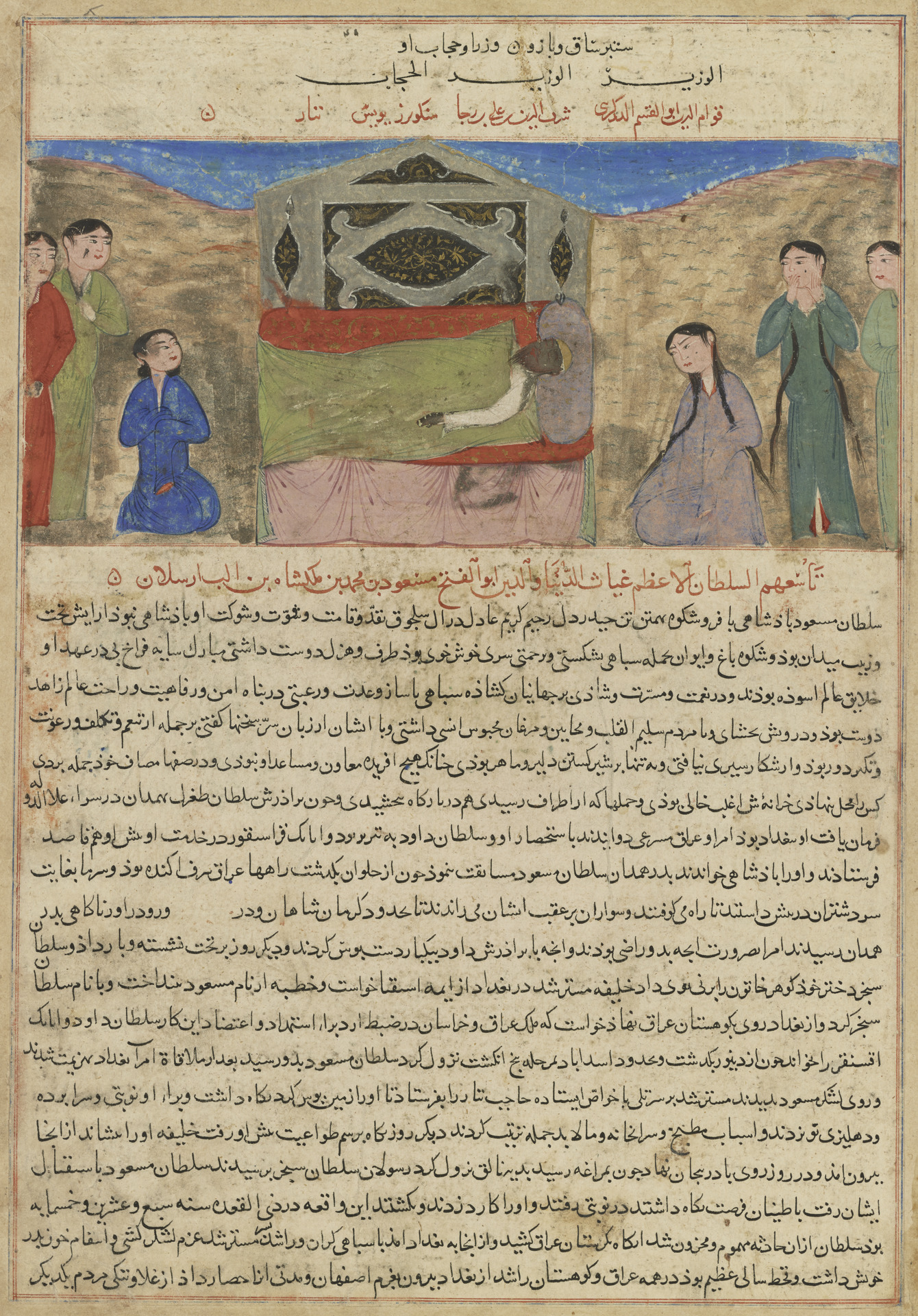
Death of the Abbasid Caliph Al-Mustarshid bi-llah, Assassinated in the year 1135

In 1135, Dubays was murdered by Assassins at the same time as the assassination of al-Mustarshid.

Actually, Nizari Ismailis during Kiya Buzurg's time had created a list of the number of assassinations; the list include the caliph Al-Mustarshid, a prefect of Isfahan, a governor of Maragha, a prefect of Tabriz, and a Qadi of Qazvin.

=== Succession ===
He was succeeded by his son al-Rashid Billah in the year 1135. He ruled for just one year from 1135 up to his deposition on 17 August 1136. When the populace of Baghdad rose in revolt against him. His son was succeeded by his half-brother al-Muqtafi on 17 September 1136.

Al-Muqtafi was the son of al-Mustazhir from his concubine named Ashin. She was from Syria.

== See also ==
- Al-Hakim I, an alleged descendant of al-Mustarshid and second Abbasid caliph in Cairo
- Anushirvan ibn Khalid, a vizier of al-Mustarshid served from 1132 to 1134.

== Bibliography ==
=== Sources ===
- Bosworth, C. E. (1968). "The Political and Dynastic History of the Iranian World (A.D. 1000–1217)". In Frye, R. N. (ed.). The Cambridge History of Iran, Volume 5: The Saljuq and Mongol periods. Cambridge: Cambridge University Press. pp. 1–202. ISBN 0-521-06936-X.
- El-Azhari, Taef (2016). Zengi and the Muslim Response to the Crusades: The Politics of Jihad. Routledge. ISBN 9780367870737.
- Bosworth, Clifford Edmund (2004). The New Islamic dynasties: A Chronological and Genealogical Manual. Edinburgh University Press. ISBN 9780748621378.
- Bosworth, C. Edmund (1984). "AḤMAD B. NEẒĀM-AL-MOLK". Encyclopaedia Iranica, Vol. I, Fasc. 6. London et al.: C. Edmund Bosworth. pp. 642–643.
- Cahen, Claude (1969). "The Turkish Invasion: The Selchükids" ( (PDF)). The First Hundred Years. pp. 135–176. Archived from the original on 2023-01-04.
- Runciman, Steven (1952). A History of the Crusades, Volume Two: The Kingdom of Jerusalem and the Frankish East, 1100–1187. Cambridge University Press. ISBN 9780521347716.
- This text is partly adapted from William Muir's public domain, The Caliphate: Its Rise, Decline, and Fall.
- Hanne, Eric. Putting the Caliph in his Place.
- اغتيال الخليفة المسترشد بالله

Al-Mustarshid Abbasid dynasty Born: 1092 Died: 29 August 1135
Sunni Islam titles
Preceded by Al-Mustazhir	Caliph of Islam; Abbasid Caliph; 6 August 1118 – 29 August 1135	Succeeded by Al-Rashid
