= Muhammad II ibn Mahmud =

Seljuk Sultan (r. 1153–1159)

Rukn al-Din Muhammad II
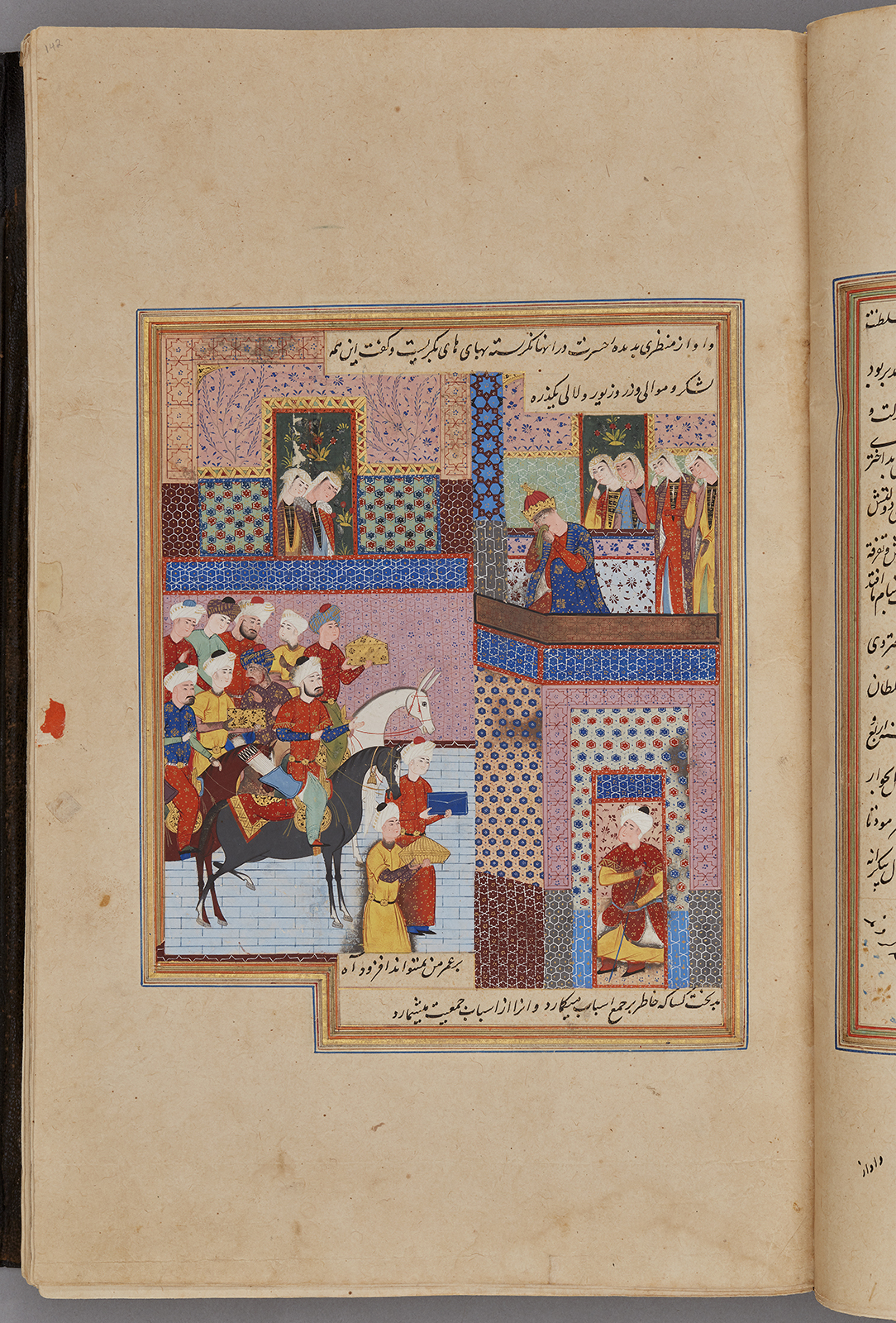
- Muhammad II mourning for his wife (the daughter of Abbasid Caliph Al-Muqtafi). Folio from a manuscript of Nigaristan, Iran, probably Shiraz, dated 1573–74.

Sultan of the Seljuq Empire
- Reign: 1153–1159
- Predecessor: Malik-Shah III
- Successor: Suleiman-Shah
- Co-sultan: Ahmad Sanjar (1153–1157)
- Born: April 1128
- Died: December 1159 – January 1160; Hamadan
- Spouse: Gawhar Khatun; Mahd Rafi Khatun; Kerman Khatun
Names
- Muhammad II ibn Mahmud
- House: House of Seljuq
- Father: Mahmud II
- Mother: Zahida Khatun (?)
- Religion: Sunni Islam

Rukn al-Din Muhammad II ibn Mahmud (1128–1159) was Sultan of Seljuq Empire from 1153 to 1159. He was son of Mahmud II and brother of Malik-Shah III. The Cambridge History of Iran notes that Sultan Muhammad "tried energetically to restore the slipping authority of his dynasty in Iraq".

== Biography ==
He was raised in Fars along with his brother Malik-Shah III. In 1148, their uncle Sultan Ghiyath ad-Din Mas'ud, who had no heirs and was in a weak position, appointed Malik-Shah III as heir, and gave his daughter in marriage to him. On 13 September 1152, Mas'ud died at Hamadan, and Malik-Shah III ascended the throne. In 1153, Muhammad, who was then in Khuzestan, marched towards Iraq and deposed his brother Malik-Shah III from the Seljuq throne, and ascended the throne himself. Meanwhile, the insurgent Abbasids under caliph al-Muqtafi was seizing the Turks of Iraq, and in 1155 supported a rival claimant to the throne, Suleiman-Shah. Furthermore, al-Muqtafi also sent an army to conquer Jibal, but the army was defeated by Muhammad. In 1157, Muhammad marched to the Abbasid capital of Baghdad with an army of 30,000 men, while his ally the Zangid Qutb ad-Din Mawdud marched from Mosul to capture the Caliphate's provinces in Central Iraq. On January 12, Muhammad reached the walls of western Baghdad.

In response the Caliph gathered all his troops from Hillah and Wasit to defend the capital. In February, unable to defend western Baghdad, the caliph abandoned the western side and ordered all the bridges over the Tigris river, which separates the western side of Baghdad from its eastern side, to be destroyed. Muhammad crossed to the western side and easily captured it, and established his camp while at the same time the caliph fortified the walls of eastern Baghdad. Several catapults and ballistas were installed on the city's walls. The caliph also armed the natives of Baghdad by giving them armour and weapons, and incited them to fight the enemy of the caliphate, whom he called infidels since they waged war against the caliph, the successor of the prophet and the leader of the ummah. He also ordered his vizier Awn ad-Din ibn Hubayra to give 5 golden dinars to every wounded soldier.

On March 4, Sultan Muhammad and his ally Zayn ad-Din, Qutb ad-Din's vizier, attacked eastern Baghdad and bombarded the city. The army of Baghdad repulsed the attack thanks to the courage of the natives of Baghdad and the naffatuns.

On March 29, the Seljuks repaired one of the bridges and crossed to the eastern side of the city, where they skirmished with both the Caliph's army and the native militias of Baghdad. The naffatuns destroyed several catapults. The Seljuks tried to breach the gate by a battering ram but it was destroyed by the catapults on the walls. The result of the battle remained indecisive for both sides. On June 29, Sultan Muhammad ordered his men to climb the walls. He had already made 400 ladders to climb the walls of Baghdad, but the assault was repulsed due to the heavy fire and casualties. In the meantime Nur ad-Din Zangi blamed his brother Qutb ad-Din for attacking the caliph's realm, which destroyed the Zengid-Seljuq alliance. Zayn ad-Din lifted the siege and returned to Mosul.

Muhammad also was forced to lift the siege after his men informed him that his brother Malik-Shah III has captured Hamadan. He eventually realized that the siege was useless, so he preferred to fight for his throne. Thus the Siege of Baghdad came to end on the July 13, 1157. Muhammad shortly managed to repel Malik-Shah III, but became sick during this period, and eventually died in 1159 at Hamadan. The powerful amir of Ray, Ïnanch Sonqur, then put Suleiman-Shah on the Seljuq throne.

== Family ==
One of his wives was Gawhar Khatun, the daughter of Sultan Ghiyath ad-Din Mas'ud and Gawhar Khatun, the daughter of Ahmad Sanjar. She had been formerly married to his brother Dawud. However, they failed to get on together, and after Dawud's death, Mas'ud married her to Muhammad in 1146. She died in 1154–55, and Muhammad mourned her deeply. Another of his wives was Mahd Rafi Khatun, also known as Kirmani Khatun. She was the daughter of Kirman Shah, son of Arslan Shah. They married in 1159. The marriage was performed by Imad al-Din Abd al-Samad Shaybani. She was brought to the capital of Hamadan in July–August 1159, and the Sultan went to receive her. He was, however, unable to consummate the marriage owing to his illness. He died five months after the marriage. Another wife was Kerman Khatun. She was the daughter of Abbasid Caliph Al-Muqtafi. They married towards the end of 1158 or in early 1159. He was, however, unable to consummate the marriage owing to his illness. Muhammad had a son, whom he handed for protection to Atabeg Hasbeg bin Ak-Sungur Ahmedili, who took him to Maragheh.

== Sources ==
- Bosworth, C. E. (1968). "The Political and Dynastic History of the Iranian World (A.D. 1000–1217)". In Frye, R. N. (ed.). The Cambridge History of Iran, Volume 5: The Saljuq and Mongol periods. Cambridge: Cambridge University Press. pp. 1–202. ISBN 0-521-06936-X.

Preceded by Malik-Shah III	Sultan of the Seljuq Empire; 1153–1159	Succeeded by Suleiman-Shah
