= Muhammad I Tapar =

Sultan of the Seljuk Empire from 1105 to 1118

Muhammad I Tapar محمد اول تاپار
- Sultan; Shahanshah
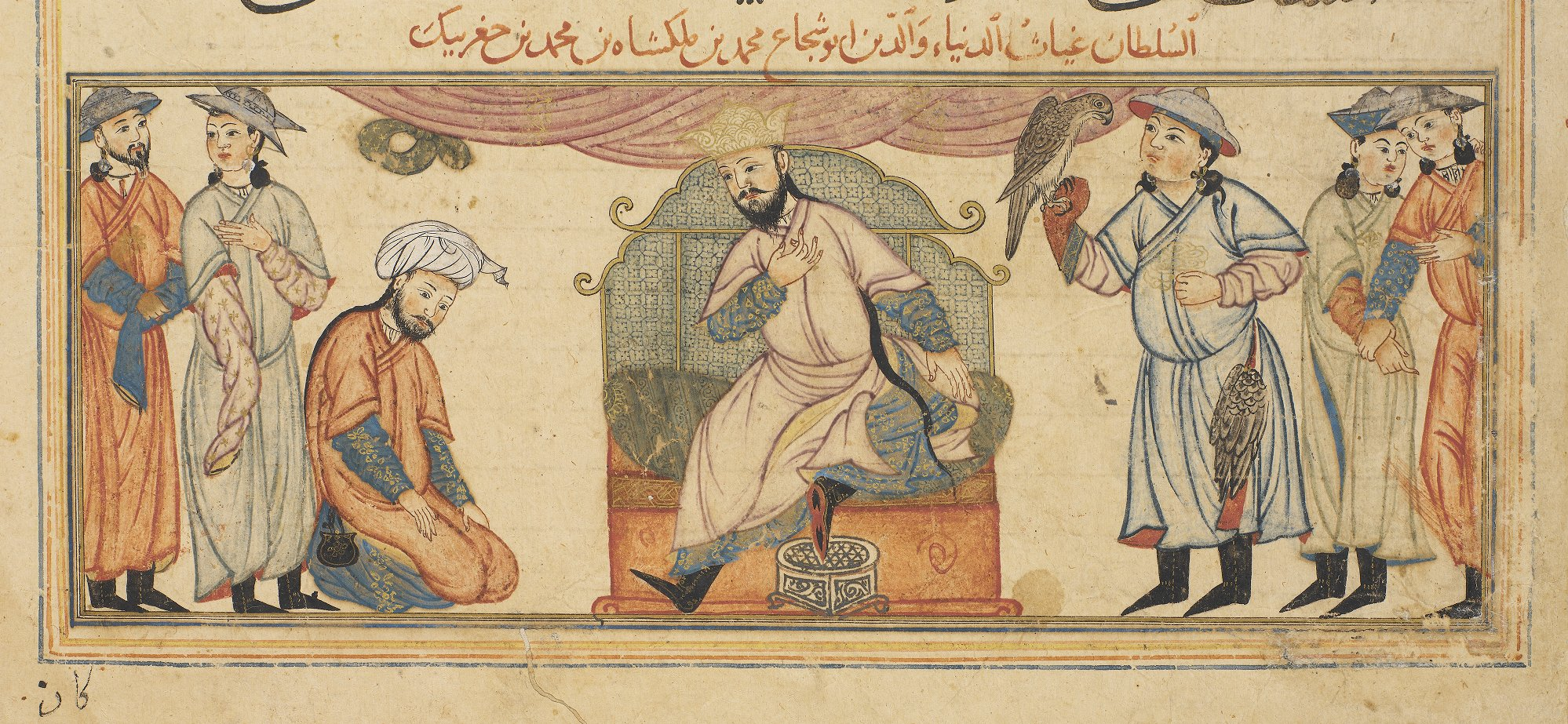
- Investiture scene of Muhammad I Tapar, from the 14th-century book Jami' al-tawarikh

Sultan of the Seljuk Empire
- Reign: 13 February 1105 – 18 April 1118
- Predecessor: Malik-Shah II
- Successor: Mahmud II (in Iraq and western Iran); Ahmad Sanjar (in Khurasan and Transoxiana)
- Born: 20 January 1082
- Died: 18 April 1118 (aged 36); Baghdad
- Spouse: Gohar Khatun; Qutlugh Khatun; Shah Khatun Safiya; Nistandar Jahan
- Issue: Mahmud II; Mas'ud; Tughril II; Suleiman-Shah; Saljuk-Shah; Fatimah Khatun
- House: House of Seljuk
- Father: Malik-Shah I
- Mother: Taj al-Din Khatun Safariyya
- Religion: Sunni Islam

Muhammad I Tapar (Persian: محمد اول تاپار; 20 January 1082 – 18 April 1118), was the sultan of the Great Seljuk Empire from 1105 to 1118. He was a son of Malik-Shah I (r. 1072–1092) and Taj al-Din Khatun Safariyya.

== Reign ==
Muhammad was born in 20 January 1082. He succeeded his nephew, Malik Shah II, as Seljuq Sultan in Baghdad, and thus was theoretically the head of the dynasty, although his brother Ahmad Sanjar in Khorasan held more practical power. Muhammad I probably allied himself with Ridwan of Aleppo in the Battle of Khabur River against Kilij Arslan I, the sultan of Rüm, in 1107, in which the latter was defeated and killed. Following the internecine conflict with his half brother, Berkyaruq, he was given the title of malik and the provinces of Armenia and Azerbaijan. Dissatisfied by this he revolted again, but had to flee back to Armenia. By 1104, Berkyaruq, ill and tired of war, agreed to divide the sultanate with Muhammad. Muhammad became sole sultan following the death of Berkyaruq in 1105.

In 1106, Muhammad conquered the Ismaili fortress of Shahdiz, and ordered the Bavandid ruler Shahriyar IV to participate in his campaign against the Ismailis. Shahriyar, greatly angered by the message Muhammad sent him, refused to aid him against the Ismailis. Shortly after, Muhammad sent an army headed by Amir Chavli, who tried to capture Sari but was unexpectedly defeated by an army under Shahriyar and his son Qarin III. Muhammad then sent a letter, which requested Shahriyar to send one of his sons to the Seljuq court in Isfahan. He sent his son Ali I, who impressed Muhammad so much that he offered him his daughter in marriage, but Ali refused and told him to grant the honor to his brother and heir of the Bavand dynasty, Qarin III. Qarin III then went to the Isfahan court and married her.

In 1106/1107, Ahmad ibn Nizam al-Mulk, the son of the famous vizier Nizam al-Mulk, went to the court of Muhammad I to file a complaint against the rais (head) of Hamadan. When Ahmad arrived to the court, Muhammad I appointed him as his vizier, replacing Sa'd al-Mulk Abu'l-Mahasen Abi, who had been recently executed on suspicion of heresy. The appointment was due mainly to the reputation of Ahmad's father. He was then given various titles which his father held (Qewam al-din, Sadr al-Islam and Nizam al-Mulk).

Muhammad I, along with his vizier Ahmad, later campaigned in Iraq, where they defeated and killed the Mazyadid ruler Sayf al-dawla Sadaqa ibn Mansur, who bore the title "king of the Arabs". In 1109, Muhammad I sent Ahmad and Chavli Saqavu to capture the Ismaili fortresses of Alamut and Ostavand, but they failed to achieve any decisive result and withdrew. Ahmad was shortly replaced by Khatir al-Mulk Abu Mansur Maybudi as vizier of the Sejluq Empire. According to Ali ibn al-Athir (a historian who lived about a hundred years later), Ahmad then retired to a private life in Baghdad, but, according to the contemporary biographer, Anushirvan ibn Khalid, Muhammad I had Ahmad imprisoned for ten years.

Muhammad I died on 18 April 1118 and was succeeded by Mahmud II, although after Muhammad I's death Sanjar was clearly the chief power in the Seljuq realms.

== Family ==
One of Muhammad's wives was Gawhar Khatun, the daughter of Isma'il, son of Yaquti. She was killed in 1118 on Muhammad's order at his death in order to prevent his brother Sanjar from marrying her. Another wife was Qutlugh Khatun. Another wife was Shah Khatun Safiya. She was the mother of Saljuk-Shah. Another wife was Nisandar Jahan, also known as Sarjahan Khatun. She was the mother of Sultan Ghiyath ad-Din Mas'ud and Fatimah Khatun. After Muhammad's death Mengubars, the governor of Iraq, married her. Their daughter Fatimah married Abbasid Caliph Al-Muqtafi in 1137, and died in September 1147. Another of his daughters married Arslan Shah I, son of Kirman Shah, and the grandson of Qavurt.

== Legacy and assessment ==
Muhammad was the last Seljuk ruler to have strong authority in the western part of the sultanate. The Seljuk realm was in a dire state after Muhammad's death, according to bureaucrat and writer Anushirvan ibn Khalid (died in 1137/1139); "In Muhammad's reign the kingdom was united and secure from all envious attacks; but when it passed to his son Mahmud, they split up that unity and destroyed its cohesion. They claimed a share with him in the power and left him only a bare subsistence." Muhammad is mainly portrayed in a positive light by contemporary historians. According to the historian Imad ad-Din al-Isfahani (died in 1201), Muhammad was "the perfect man of the Seljuk dynasty and their strongest steed".

Muhammad's ceaseless campaigns inspired one of his poets, Iranshah, to compose the Persian epic poem of Bahman-nama, an Iranian mythological story about the constant battles between Kay Bahman and Rostam's family. This implies that the work was also written to serve as advice for solving the socio-political issues of the time.

== Religious policies ==
Muhammad Tapar's religious policies were deeply rooted in his personal piety and his strong support for Sunni Islam. He actively worked to strengthen religion and suppress perceived innovations and heresy, particularly those associated with the Ismailis. This commitment earned him the title of a mujahid, or holy warrior, in the strengthening of religion. His reign was characterized by a concerted effort to repel heretical groups who had become "very strong" during his time. The historical memory of Muhammad Tapar is of a just ruler who was a friend to religious clerics.

In addition to his support for the Ulama, Muhammad Tapar's religious policies extended to economic and legal matters. He notably abolished non-canonical taxes. This act was a significant demonstration of his adherence to Islamic law, as it removed taxes not sanctioned by religious texts. Overall, Muhammad Tapar's reign was remembered for his commitment to justice, his personal faith, and his dedication to supporting the Sunni religious establishment.

== Sources ==
- Askari, Nasrin (2016). The medieval reception of the Shāhnāma as a mirror for princes. Brill. ISBN 978-90-04-30790-2.
- Muir, William. "Buweihid Dynasty, Bagdad under Seljuqs, Toghril Beg, Al-Muktadi and four following Caliphs, Crusades, Capture of Jerusalem, End of Fatimids". The Caliphate, its rise, decline and fall.
- Madelung, W. (1984). "ĀL-E BĀVAND (BAVANDIDS)". Encyclopaedia Iranica, Vol. I, Fasc. 7. London u.a.: Routledge & Kegan Paul. pp. 747–753. ISBN 90-04-08114-3.
- Bosworth, C.E. (1993). "Muḥammad b. Malik-S̲h̲āh". In Bosworth, C. E.; van Donzel, E.; Heinrichs, W. P. & Pellat, Ch. (eds.). The Encyclopaedia of Islam, Second Edition. Volume VII: Mif–Naz. Leiden: E. J. Brill. p. 408. ISBN 978-90-04-09419-2.
- Bosworth, C. Edmund (1984). "AḤMAD B. NEẒĀM-AL-MOLK". Encyclopaedia Iranica, Vol. I, Fasc. 6. London et al.: C. Edmund Bosworth. pp. 642–643.
- Bosworth, C. E. (1968). "The Political and Dynastic History of the Iranian World (A.D. 1000–1217)". In Frye, R. N. (ed.). The Cambridge History of Iran, Volume 5: The Saljuq and Mongol periods. Cambridge: Cambridge University Press. pp. 1–202. ISBN 0-521-06936-X.
- Bosworth, C. E. (2010). "The steppe peoples in the Islamic world". In Morgan, David O.; Reid, Anthony (eds.). The New Cambridge History of Islam (Volume 3). Cambridge: Cambridge University Press. pp. 21–78. ISBN 978-0521850315.
- Peacock, A. C. S. (2015). The Great Seljuk Empire. Edinburgh University Press. pp. 1–378. ISBN 978-0-7486-3826-0.
- Safi, Omid (2006). The Politics of Knowledge in Premodern Islam: Negotiating Ideology and Religious Inquiry. University of North Carolina Press.

Preceded by Malik Shah II	Sultan of the Seljuq Empire; 1105–1118	Succeeded by Ahmed Sanjar (in Khorasan and Transoxiana)
Preceded by Malik Shah II	Sultan of the Seljuq Empire; 1105–1118	Succeeded by Mahmud II (in Iraq and Persia)
