= Mahmud II (Seljuk sultan) =

Seljuk Sultan (r. 1118–1131)

- مغیث الدنیا و الدین محمود دوم بن محمد تپر بن مالک شاه
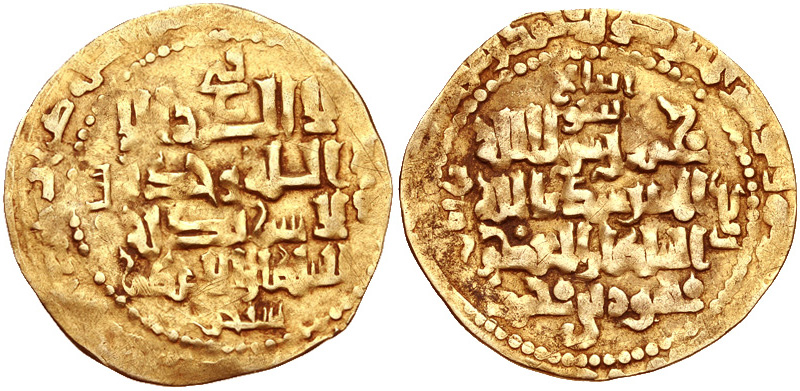
- Gold dinar struck under Mahmud II, citing governor Inanch Yabghu. Struck at the Rudhravar mint, dated 1125/6.

Sultan of the Seljuk Empire
- Reign: 18 April 1118 – 11 September 1131
- Predecessor: Muhammad I
- Successor: Dawud
- Co-sultan: Ahmad Sanjar (1118–1131)
- Born: c. 1098 or 1104
- Died: 11 September 1131 (age 33 or 27)
- Consort: Mah-i Mulk Khatun; Amir Sitti Khatun; Ata Khatun; Zahida Khatun (?)
- Issue: Dawud; Alp Arslan; Malik Shah III; Muhammad II; Farrukh Shah; Ala al-Daula Ata Khan; Gawhar Nasab Khatun; Turkan Khatun; Zinat Khatun; Zumurrud Khatun
Names
- Mughith al-Dunya wa'l-Din Mahmud bin Muhammad Tapar bin Malik Shah
- Father: Muhammad I Tapar
- Religion: Sunni Islam

Mughith al-Dunya wa'l-Din Mahmud bin Muhammad (b. 1104 – 11 September 1131) known as Mahmud II was the Seljuk sultan of Iraq from 1118–1131 following the death of his father Muhammad I Tapar. At the time Mahmud was fourteen, and ruled over Iraq and Persia.

== Biography ==
During Mahmud's early reign, his vassal king Garshasp II, who was a favorite of his father Muhammad I, fell into disgrace. Slander about him spread to the court that made him lose confidence, and made Mahmud send a military force to Yazd where Garshasp was arrested and jailed in Jibal, while Yazd was granted to the royal cupbearer. Garshasp, however, escaped and returned to Yazd, where he requested protection from Mahmud's rival Ahmad Sanjar (Garshasp's wife was the sister of Ahmad).

Garshasp urged Ahmad to invade the domains of Mahmud in Central Persia, and gave him information on how to march to Central Persia, and the ways to combat Mahmud. Meanwhile Ahmad had his own ambitions, wishing to restore the unity of the Great Seljuks under one Sultan, as had been prior to the death of Malikshah. Mahmud's attempt of placating his uncle with a large tribute of 200,000 dinars, coupled the cession of Mazandaran, failed.

Using the excuse of his nephew's youth, manipulated by his viziers, Ahmad advanced westwards, until in September 1118 he met Mahmud at the Battle of Saveh. Here, Sanjar almost faltered, outnumbered, in unfamiliar terrain and with water supply in the hands of Mahmud; it was only the last minute intervention of Sanjar's 18 war elephants (emulating Ghaznavid tactics), frightening Mahmud's cavalry, which won the day.

Victorious, Sanjar pushed to Baghdad. Whereupon Mahmud was married to one of Sanjar's daughters and made his uncle's heir. However, the narrowness of his victory highlighted to Sanjar just how precarious his situation was. Outnumbered and without local support he returned everything to Mahmud save for Rayy and restored the domains of Garshasp II, before returning back east.

Mahmud's younger brother Mas'ud revolted against him in 1120, but the civil war ended the following year due to the intervention of the atabeg of Mosul, Aqsunqur al-Bursuqi, and Mas'ud was pardoned. In 1126, al-Bursuqi was murdered by Assassins, believed have been under orders from Mahmud. In 1127, he appointed Anushirvan ibn Khalid as his vizier, but had him removed from the office the following year. In 1129 Mahmud officially recognized the authority of Imad al-Din Zengi, who had supported him against a revolt led by al-Mustarshid, caliph of Baghdad, in Syria and northern Iraq. Mahmud ruled from Isfahan, while his Shihna military governors for Iraq were based in Baghdad, except for a campaign which he led personally against the Caliph of Baghdad in 1126.

Mahmud, then aged 27, died on 11 September 1131. His death was followed by a civil war between his son Dawud, and his brothers Mas'ud, Suleiman-Shah, and Toghrul II. His other son Alp Arslan ibn Mahmud was ruler of Mosul under the protection of atabeg Zengi.

== Family ==
In around 1116, Mahmud was bethrothed to his cousin Mah-i Mulk Khatun, also known as Mahd-i Maymun, the daughter of his uncle Sultan Ahmad Sanjar. The marriage took place in around 1119. Her dowry was portrayed as a precious treasure transported on elephants from Khurasan to Mahmud in Iraq. The two together had a son. In 1121, a fire consumed the palace that Mujahid al-Din Bahruz had built for Mahmud. The blaze resulted in Mah-i Mulk losing precious possessions, including jewels, ornaments, furnishings, and clothing. She died in 1122, after which Sanjar asked for the return of the gold and jewellery his daughter had, but Mahmud refused to give back the jewellery. In 1124, Sanjar sent another daughter, Amir Sitti Khatun, to be Mahmud's wife. They had a daughter, Gawhar Nasab Khatun and a son, Malik-Shah III. She exercised great influence at Mahmud's court and supported Mazyadid Dubays ibn Sadaqa. In 1129, Vizier Abul-Qasim al-Anasabadhi, who was arrested by Mahmud, but was later freed by Sanjar was appointed as her vizier by Sanjar. She died in 1129. After her death Dubays' position fell apart. Another wife was Ata Khatun, the daughter of Garshasp II, the son of Ali ibn Faramurz and Arslan Khatun, the daughter of Chaghri Beg. They had a son Ala al-Daula Ata Khan. Another wife, who was the mother of Mahmud's son, Alp Arslan, died while living at the residence of Aq Sunqur al-Bursuqi. According to Ann Lambton, Zahida Khatun, the wife of Atabeg Boz-aba was probably the mother of Mahmud's son Muhammad. One of his concubines was the mother of his daughter Turkan Khatun, who married Sulaiman Shah, one of the great-grandsons of Qavurt. Some other daughters were Zinat Khatun and Zumurrud Khatun. His sons were Dawud, Malik-Shah III, Muhammad II, Alp Arslan, Farrukh Shah and Ala al-Daula Ata Khan.

== Sources ==
- Bosworth, C. E. (1968). "The Political and Dynastic History of the Iranian World (A.D. 1000–1217)". In Frye, R. N. (ed.). The Cambridge History of Iran, Volume 5: The Saljuq and Mongol periods. Cambridge: Cambridge University Press. pp. 1–202. ISBN 0-521-06936-X.
- Bosworth, E. (2000). The History of the Seljuq Turks: The Saljuq-nama of Zahir al-Din Nishpuri. Taylor & Francis. ISBN 978-1-136-75257-5.
- Bosworth, C. Edmund (1983). "ABŪ KĀLĪJĀR GARŠĀSP (II)". Encyclopaedia Iranica, Vol. I, Fasc. 3. London et al.: C. Edmund Bosworth. pp. 328–329.
- El-Azhari, T. (2016). Zengi and the Muslim Response to the Crusades: The politics of Jihad. Routledge Studies in the History of Iran and Turkey. Taylor & Francis. p. 219. ISBN 978-1-317-58938-9.
- Lambton, A.K.S. (1988). Continuity and Change in Medieval Persia. Bibliotheca Persica. Bibliotheca Persica. pp. 259–61. ISBN 978-0-88706-133-2.
- Richards, D.S. (2010). The Chronicle of Ibn Al-Athir for the Crusading Period from Al-Kamil fi'l-Ta'rikh.: The Years 491-541/1097-1146 the Coming of the Franks and the Muslim Response. Crusade texts in translation. Ashgate. pp. 241, 276. ISBN 978-0-7546-6950-0.
- Peacock, A.C.S. (2015). Great Seljuk Empire. The Edinburgh History of the Islamic Empires EUP. Edinburgh University Press. ISBN 978-0-7486-9807-3.

| Preceded by Muhammad I Tapar | Sultan of the Seljuk Empire; 1118–1131 | Succeeded by Civil war |
