= Ahmad Sanjar =

Sultan of the Seljuk Empire from 1118 to 1157

- Great Sultan; Sultan of Sultans
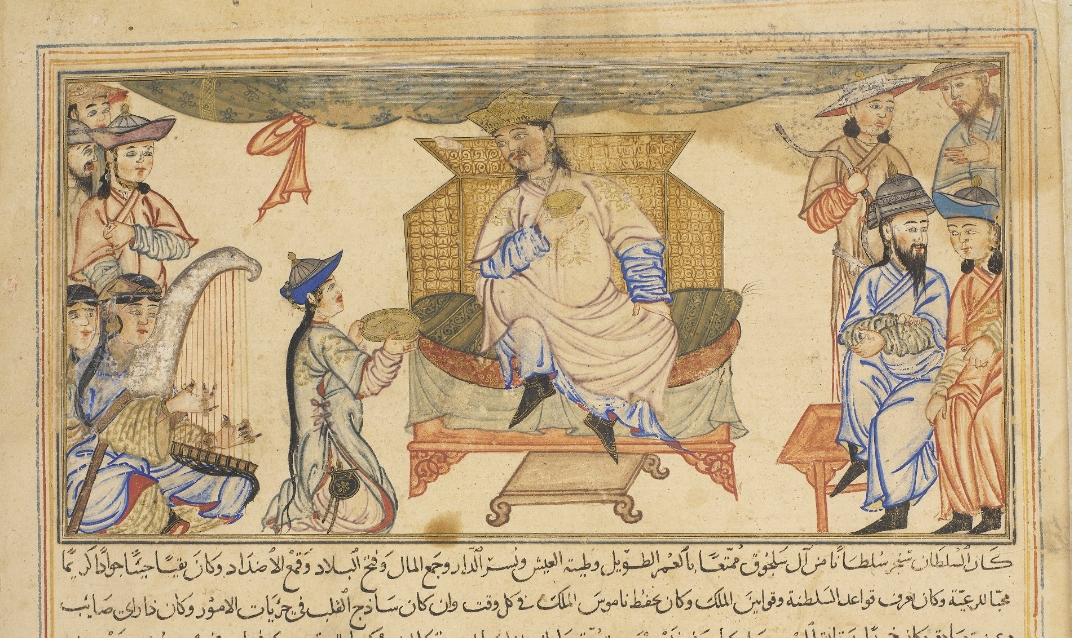
- Ahmad Senjer seated on his throne, in a 1307 Ilkhanid miniature.

Sultan of the Great Seljuq Empire
- Reign: 18 April 1118 – 8 May 1157
- Predecessor: Muhammad I Tapar
- Co-sultan: Mahmud II (1118–1131); Dawud (1131–1132); Tughril II (1132–1134); Mas'ud (1134–1152); Malik-Shah III (1152–1153); Muhammad II (1153–1157)

Malik of Khorasan
- Reign: 1097–1118
- Predecessor: Arslan Argun
- Successor: Office abolished
- Born: 6 November 1086; Sinjar
- Died: 8 May 1157 (aged 70); Merv
- Consort: Turkan Khatun; Rasudan Abkhaziyya Khatun
- Issue: Mah-i Mulk Khatun; Amir Sitti Khatun; Amira Khatun; Gawhar Khatun
- Dynasty: Seljuq
- Father: Malik-Shah I
- Mother: Taj Safariyya Khatun
- Religion: Sunni Islam

Ahmad Sanjar (Persian: احمد سنجر; full name: Muizz ad-Dunya wa ad-Din Adud ad-Dawlah Abul-Harith Ahmad Sanjar ibn Malik-Shah) (6 November 1086 – 8 May 1157) was the Seljuq ruler of Khorasan from 1097 until 1118, when he became the Sultan of the Seljuq Empire, which he ruled until his death in 1157. His rule from the first moment was characterized by climactic battles in a struggle for survival on all frontiers, and throughout his long reign (1118-1157) which lasted for 41 years, he nearly kept the borders of the Seljuks intact, but suffered setbacks at Qatwan and Muharram later during his rule when his composure and astute thinking began to recede, further exacerbated by his capture by Oghuz Turkmen in 1153. After his death, the Seljuk Empire was significantly weakened and lasted less than half a century.

== Early years ==
Sanjar was born on 6 November 1086 in Sinjar, a town situated in Upper Mesopotamia. Although primary sources state that he was named after his birthplace (Rāvandi, p. 185; Ebn al-Jawzi, XVIII, p. 161) Bosworth notes Sanjar is a Turkic name, denoting "he who pierces", "he who thrusts". He was a son of Malik Shah I and participated in wars of succession against his three brothers and a nephew, namely Mahmud I, Berkyaruq, Malik Shah II and Muhammad I. In 1096, he was given the province of Khorasan to govern under his brother Muhammad I. Over the next several years Ahmad Sanjar became the ruler of most of Iran with his capital at Nishapur.

== Literary appearance ==
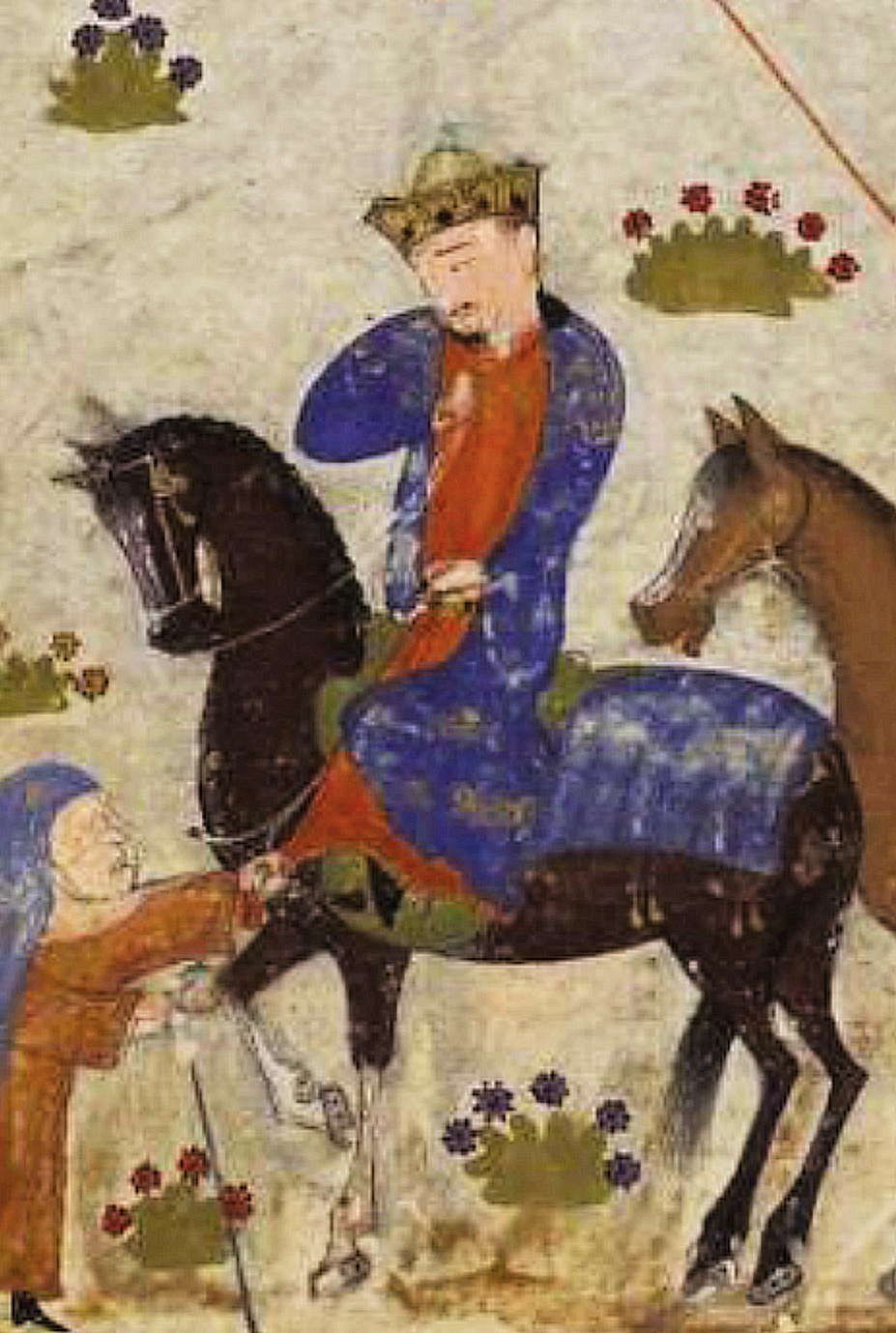
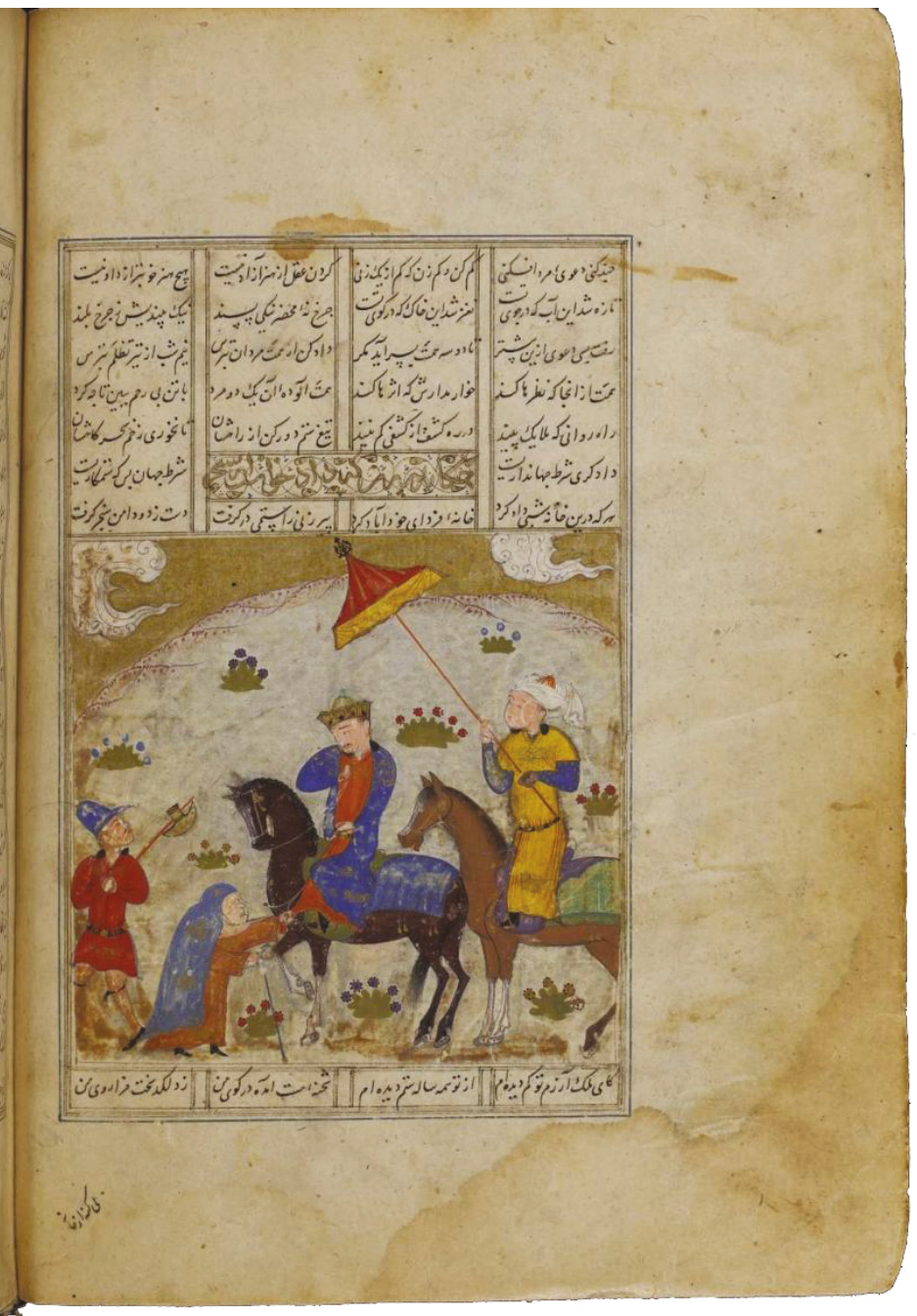
Sultan Sanjar accosted by an old woman Khamsa of Nizami (Shiraz, 1485), Aq Qoyunlu manuscript

Sultan Sanjar appears as a protagonist in Persian literature and miniatures, especially the Khamsa of Nizami. An old woman stops him as he travels on horse, and scolds him for allowing his soldiers to hunt her cow, the only source of sustenance for herself and her four fatherless children. The king accepted her grievance and ordered the cow to be saved. The moral is that one should always help those in need, and salvation is only attained through good deed. Miniatures of the scene have been reproduced in various styles over the centuries by many different dynasties, starting with the Jalayirid in the Khamsa of Nizami (1386-88), and continuing with the Timurids (1495-96), the Aq Qoyunlu with the Khamsa of Nizami (Shiraz, 1484), Khamsa of Nizami (Shiraz, 1485), Khamsa of Nizami (Shiraz, 1501) and the Safavids (16-17th century).

== Campaigns and Battles ==
=== Campaign in Khorasan ===
Malik Sanjar, commissioned by his elder brother Sultan Berkyaruq to lead an expedition against his rebellious uncle Malik Arslan Argun, learned upon arriving in Damghan that Malik Arslan Argun had been killed by one of his slaves. Malik Sanjar and his army joined forces with Sultan Berkyaruq's army in Damghan and advanced towards Khorasan. On April 21, 1097, they captured Nishapur and then Khorasan, which was under Arslan Argun's control. They then marched on Balkh, where Arslan Argun's army was stationed. Upon learning of Berkyaruq and Sanjar's approach, Arslan Argun's army, along with 7 year old son of Arslan Argun, retreated to the mountainous regions of Tokharistan and begged for forgiveness. Sultan Berkyaruq, accepting their plea for forgiveness, treated his 7 year old cousin well and granted him the fiefs that had been given to his uncle Arslan Argun during his father Sultan Malik-Shah's reign. After resolving this matter, they marched on Termez and captured the city.

=== Battle with Emir Muhammad ===
In 1097, Berkyaruq appointed Sanjar as the governor of Khorasan. The Seljuk Malik Emir Muhammad (Note: In some sources, his name is written as Mehmed instead of Muhammed. Mehmed is the Turkish form of Muhammed.) rebelled during Sanjar's term as governor of Khorasan and sought support to take control of Khorasan. Emir Muhammad found this support from the Ghaznavids and marched against Sanjar. Upon receiving news that Emir Muhammad had arrived with his army, Sanjar marched against him with his army. In the battle between the two sides, Emir Muhammad's army was defeated and Emir Muhammad was taken prisoner. Thanks to this victory, Sanjar both increased his reputation and prevented Khorasan from falling into the hands of the Ghaznavids. Because if Emir Muhammad had been victorious, he would have entered the service of the Ghaznavids as the governor of Khorasan.

=== Battle of Balkh (1098) ===
The Seljuk malik Devlet-Shah, who formed an army in Tokharistan and rebelled in 1098, launched an expedition to seize control of Khorasan. Devlet-Shah marched with his army towards Balkh. Hearing that Devlet-Shah was approaching Balkh, Sanjar launched an expedition against him. The two armies met near Balkh. In the ensuing battle, Devlet-Shah and his army were defeated. Devlet-Shah was taken prisoner, his eyes sealed, and he was imprisoned.

=== Battle of Nushecan (1100) ===
When Sanjar was governor of Khorasan, there was a governor named Habeshi ibn Altuntak. Parts of Khorasan, Tabaristan, and Gerdkuh were under the control of the Habeshi. Sanjar launched an expedition against the Habeshi with an army of 20,000. Later, Sanjar received news that a 5,000-strong Batini army had arrived to support the Habeshi. The Habeshi army was larger than Sanjar's, and this caused unrest within Sanjar's army. According to some sources, the Habeshi requested assistance from Berkyaruq, who responded positively. Berkyaruq came to Khorasan with his army. The two armies met near Nushecan. In the battle between the two parties, Sanjar's army defeated Berkyaruq's army. Habeshi bin Altuntaq was taken prisoner.

=== Defense of Khorasan (1102) ===
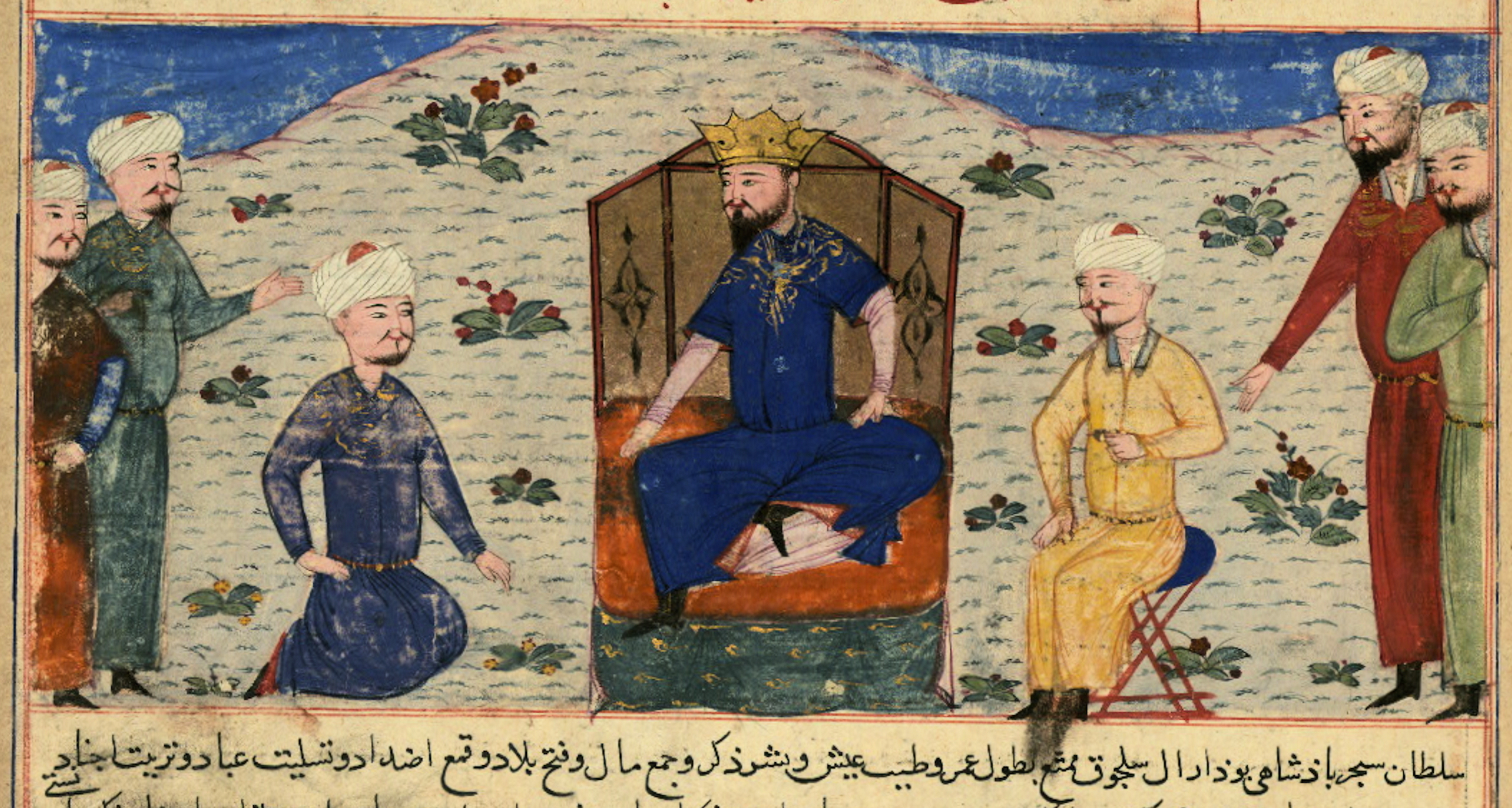
Sultan Sanjar with courtiers. Majma' al-tavarikh by Hafiz Abru (dated 1425). Walters Ms. W.676 Fa.

While Sanjar was not in Khorasan, the Kara-Khanid ruler Kadir Khan (Arslan Khan) took advantage of this and went on an expedition to Khorasan with an army of 100,000. Sanjar, who heard about this expedition of Kadir Khan, returned with his cavalry unit. While Kadir Khan (Arslan Khan) was out hunting, he was taken prisoner in a sudden raid by the Seljuks. Sanjar ordered Kadir Khan to be killed. Thus, Sanjar took control of Transoxiana. Sanjar then attacked Termez, captured the city, and installed Muhammad ibn Suleiman on the Western Kara-Khanid throne. Muhammad ibn Suleiman ascended the throne in Samarkand.

=== Struggle with Ömer Khan ===
A civil war erupted within the Kara-Khanid Khanate due to a struggle between two men, Ömer Khan and Arslan Khan Muhammed. Following this struggle, Arslan Khan Muhammed was defeated and fled Samarkand. However, despite his victory, Ömer Khan began experiencing problems with his army and was forced to leave Kara-Khanid territories and had to Khwarazm, which belonged to the Seljuk Empire. Upon arriving in Khwarazm, Ömer Khan engaged in a battle with Sanjar, the Seljuk governor of Khorasan. Following this battle, Ömer Khan was defeated and killed.

=== Battle of Nakhshab (1110) ===
In 1110, the Kara-Khanid prince Sagün Bey gathered an army and rebelled against the Kara-Khanid ruler Muhammad ibn Suleiman. In the face of this rebellion, Muhammad ibn Suleiman asked for help from Sanjar, the governor of Khorasan of the Seljuk Empire, of which he was a vassal. Sanjar responded positively and sent his army to Kara-Khanid territory. The two armies met near Nakhshab. In the ensuing battle, Sagün Bey and his army suffered a major defeat. Sanjar's army gained considerable booty. After these events, Sanjar's army returned to Khorasan.

=== Campaign against the Nizari Ismailis ===
Sanjar undertook a campaign to eliminate the Nizari Ismailis within Persia and successfully drove them from a number of their strongholds, including Quhistan and Tabas. However, an anecdote indicates that en route to their chief stronghold at Alamut, Sanjar woke up one day to find a dagger beside him, pinning a note from Hassan-i Sabbah stating that he (Hassan) would like peace. Sanjar, shocked by this event, sent envoys to Hassan and they both agreed to stay out of each other's way.

=== Battle of Ghazni (1117) ===
The death of Mas'ud III of Ghazni in 1115 began a heated contest for the throne. Shirzad took the throne that year but the next year he was assassinated by his younger brother Arslan. Arslan had to face the rebellion of his other brother, Bahram, who received support from the Seljuk Sultan Ahmad Sanjar. Ahmad Sanjar invading from Khorasan took his army into Afghanistan and inflicted a crushing defeat to Arslan near Ghazni at Shahrabad. Arslan managed to escape and Bahram succeeded to the throne as the Seljuk's vassal.

=== Battle of Saveh (1119) ===
On February 26, 1105 Sultan Berkyaruq died. He was suceded his younger son and heir, Malik-Shah II. However, the true power was in the hands of his uncle, Muhammad Tapar. In the same year, Muhammad Tapar dethroned his nephew and started to rule the State himself as sultan. When Muhammad died on April 4, 1118, his son Mahmud II was declared as new sultan.

When Muhammad's son Mahmud II ascended the throne, Emir of Yazd Garshasp II fell into disgrace; slander about him spread to the court that made him lose confidence, and made Mahmud send a military force to Yazd where Garshasp was arrested and jailed in Jibal, while Yazd was granted to the royal cupbearer. Garshasp, however, escaped and returned to Yazd, where he requested protection from Ahmad Sanjar (Garshasp's wife was the sister of Ahmad Sanjar).

Garshasp urged Ahmad to invade the domains of Mahmud in Central Persia, and gave him information on how to march to Central Persia, and the ways to combat Mahmud. Meanwhile Ahmad had his own ambitions, wishing to restore the unity of the Great Seljuks under one Sultan, as had been prior to the death of Malik-Shah I. Mahmud's attempt of placating his uncle with a large tribute of 200,000 dinars, coupled the cession of Mazandaran, failed.

Sanjar, upon learning that his nephew Mahmud had distanced himself from state affairs and made wrong decisions, organized an expedition to the western part of his country with an army of 20,000 men, including 18 elephants. Upon hearing that his uncle Sanjar was campaigning westward, Mahmud set out against him with an army of 30,000 men. Mahmud's army included prominent emirs such as Hacib Ali Bar, Atabek Guzoğlu, Mengübars, Sungur Buhari, and Karaca Saki, along with Porsukoğlları. Until in 11 Agust 1119 Sanjar and five kings, as well as some Nizari forces, met Mahmud at Saveh (The 5 kings being: Garshasp II himself, the emirs of Sistan and of Khwarazm, and two other unnamed kings). When the war broke out between the two sides, Mahmud's army, being numerically superior, began to gain the upper hand. Sanjar's right and left flanks were routed. Seeing the situation turn against him, Sanjar ordered elephants to be brought onto the battlefield. Upon the elephants' entry into the battle, Mahmud's cavalry retreated in fear. Following this, the war turned in Sanjar's favor, and Mahmud's army was routed. Mahmud fled the battlefield.

Victorious, Sanjar pushed to Baghdad. Whereupon Mahmud was married to one of Sanjar's daughters and made his uncle's heir. However, the narrowness of his victory highlighted to Sanjar just how precarious his situation was. Later, after some efforts, peace was made between the two sides. Mahmud, as Sanjar's vassal, was appointed to govern the western territories of the country, excluding Ray and Sanjar restored the domains of Garshasp II, before returning back east.

=== Campaign against the Western Kara-Khanid (1130) ===
As a result of the internal turmoil that broke out in the Western Kara-Khanid country in 1130, the Western Kara-Khanid ruler Arslan Khan asked for help from Sanjar. After a while, he announced that the internal unrest had ended and asked for Sanjar to return. Later, it was revealed that Sanjar would be assassinated by Arslan Khan's order. Following these events, Sanjar marched to Samarkand with his army and laid siege to the city. The Seljuk army under the command of Sanjar captured Samarkand.

=== Battle of Kashgar ===
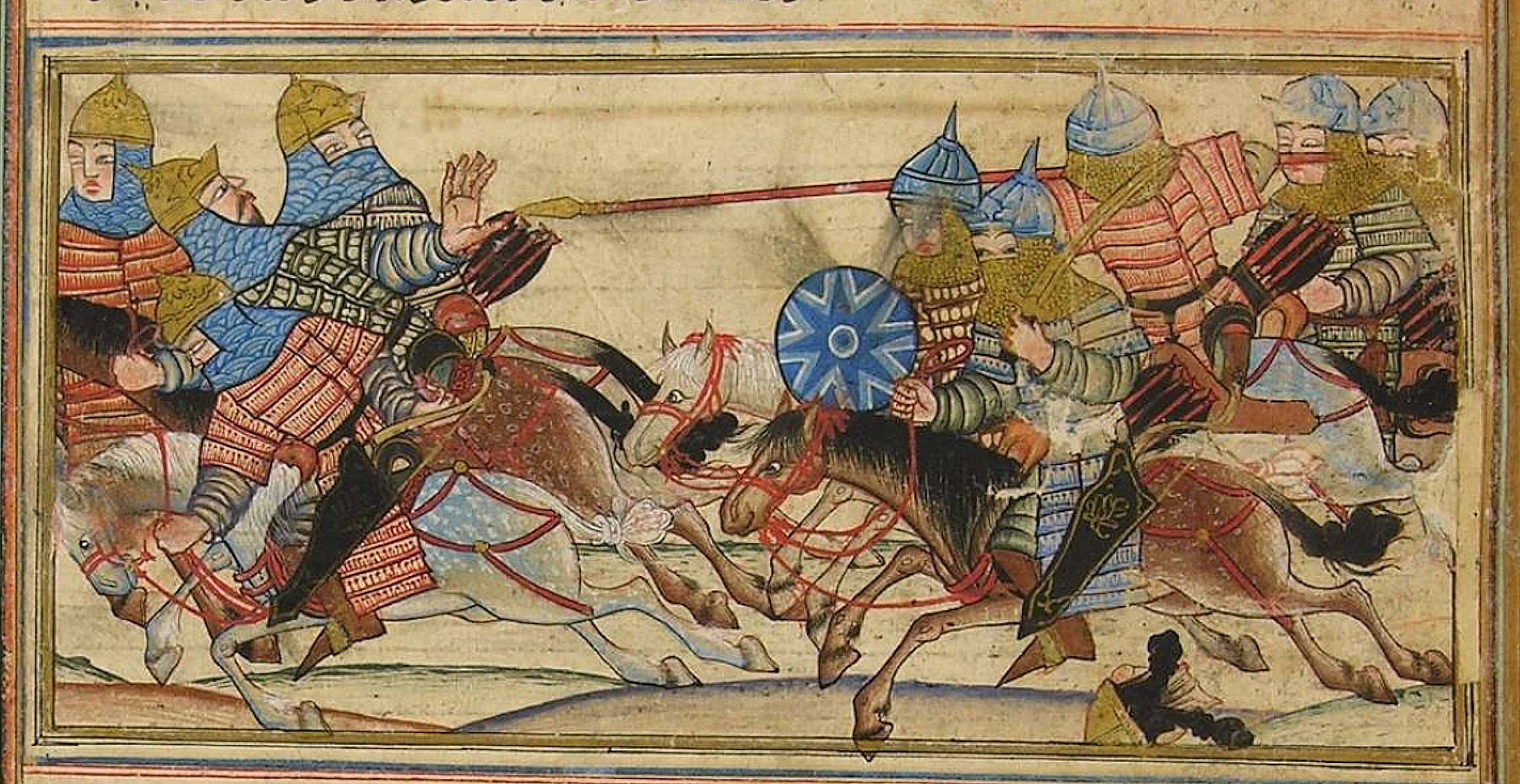
A miniature depicting the war with the Oghuz during the reign of Sultan Sanjar. Jami al-Tawarikh, TSMK, H.1653 (dated 1314).

When the Qara-Khitans migrating west arrived in the Kara-Khanid lands, the Eastern Kara-Khanid ruler Ahmed Khan defeated the Qara-Khitans in 1122 and took them into his service. Later, after the death of Ahmed Khan, during the reign of the ruler who ascended to the Eastern Kara-Khanid throne, a rebellion broke out in the Eastern Kara-Khanid lands, including many tribes, primarily the Oghuz and Karluks. Taking advantage of this rebellion, the Qara-Khitans captured Balasagun. The Eastern Kara-Khanid, who were vassals of the Great Seljuk Empire, asked for help from the Great Seljuk Sultan Sanjar. Sanjar also organized an expedition with his army to the Eastern Kara-Khanid lands in 1130. The leader of the rebels fled upon hearing of Sanjar's arrival. Sanjar defeated the advancing towards the Eastern Islamic lands Qara-Khitai army near Kashgar, and then defeated the Oghuz, Karluks and other tribes.

=== Battle of Dinavar (1132) ===
After Mahmud's death, his son Davud and brothers Mas'ud and Seljuk-Shah started a struggle for power. Sanjar, disturbed by this struggle, organized an expedition with his army to the western part of the country.When Sanjar arrived in the region, news spread that he would march on Baghdad with his army. Later, Sanjar's name was removed from the khutbahs and Mas'ud, Seljuk-Shah and the caliph Al-Mustarshid formed an alliance against Sanjar. Sanjar prepared his army against this alliance and marched against them. The two armies met near Dinavar. As a result of the battle, the allies were defeated by Sanjar. Sanjar later gave Tughril the lands under Mahmud's control.

=== Campaign against the Ghaznavids (1135) ===
Bahram Shah, Sultan of the Ghaznavid Empire, a vassal of the Great Seljuk Empire, failed to pay taxes to the Seljuk Empire. He also seized the property of his own people and mistreated them. Following these developments, Sultan Sanjar decided to campaign against the Ghaznavids. In August or September 1135, the Seljuk army mobilized and entered the Ghaznavid Empire's territory, arriving near their capital, Ghazni. Bahram Shah did not dare to fight and sent ambassadors to Sultan Sanjar. Bahram Shah then abandoned Ghazni and fled to India. Consequently, the Seljuk army under Sultan Sanjar captured Ghazni, the Ghaznavid capital, and seized Bahram Shah's property. Sultan Sanjar also remedied the grievances of the people of Ghazni and put the state's affairs in order. In exchange for Bahram Shah's apology and promise not to repeat his past mistakes, Sultan Sanjar pardoned him and reinstated him as Sultan of Ghaznavid Empire. Additionally, the Seljuks captured 10,000 Ghaznavid soldiers in this campaign.

=== Campaign in Khwarezm (1138) ===
Atsiz, one of Sanjar's governors, captured Jand and Mangyshlak and killed the Muslims who fought against the enemy forces in this region. After these events, Sanjar decided to organize an expedition against Atsiz. In 1138, Sanjar marched with his army to Khwarezm and defeated Atsiz and his army in the Battle of Hazorasp and captured Khwarezm. He then left the governorship of Khwarezm to his nephew Suleiman-Shah and returned to his capital, Merv.

=== Battle of Qatwan (1141) ===
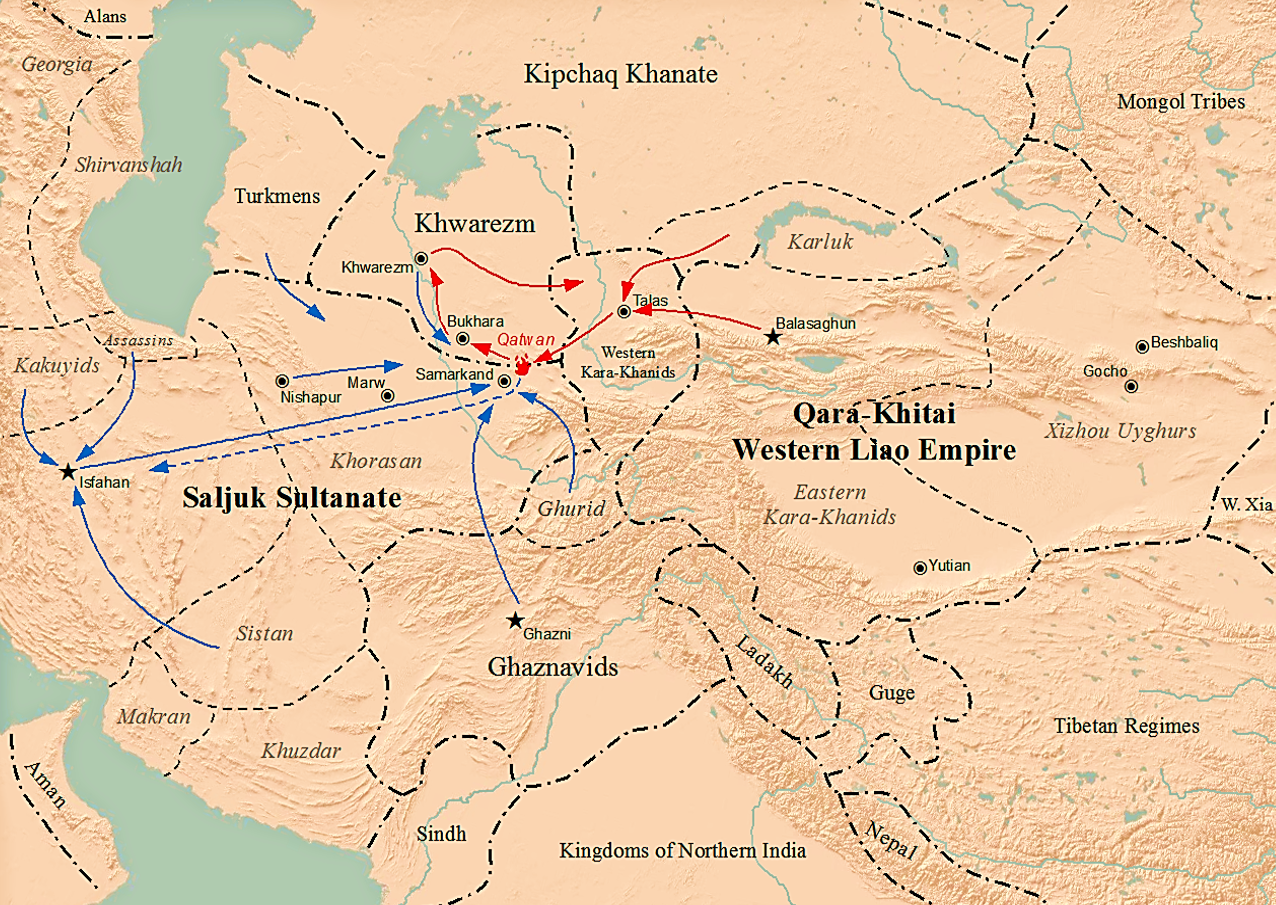
Battle of Qatwan in 1141

In 1141, Ahmad, along with Garshasp II, marched to confront the Kara Khitan threat and engaged them near Samarkand at the Battle of Qatwan. He suffered an astounding defeat, and Garshasp was killed. Ahmad escaped with only fifteen of his elite horsemen, losing all Seljuq territory east of the Syr Darya (Jaxartes).

=== Campaign in Khwarezm (1143) ===
Atsiz entered into a struggle with Suleiman-Shah in 1141 and captured Khwarezm. Atsiz declared his loyalty to Sanjar, who was preparing to go on a campaign against the Kara-Khitans. Since Sanjar was also going on a campaign against the Kara-Khitans, he did not send him an army and left him as the governor of Khwarezm. Taking advantage of the defeat following the Battle of Qatwan, Atsiz attacked Khorasan, occupied and plundered many cities, including the capital Merv, and captured their scholars. After escaping the Battle of Qatwan, Sanjar marched against Atsiz with the new army he had established. After these events, Atsiz fled to Khwarezm. Sanjar then marched to Khwarezm with his army in 1143. Sanjar entered the Khwarezm region and invaded Khwarezm. Later, Sanjar advanced to Urgench, the capital of Khwarezm, where Atsiz was located, and besieged the city. Realizing that he could not cope with Sanjar, Atsiz asked for forgiveness from Sanjar and returned the goods he had plundered and the scholars he had captured.

=== Campaign in Khwarezm (1147) ===
When Sanjar received news that Atsiz was continuing to disobey, he sent an envoy to him. While the envoy was with Atsiz, he informed Sanjar that there was a plan to assassinate Sanjar and that two assassins had been sent to Khorasan for this purpose. Atsiz, who learned of what the envoy had done, killed the envoy. Following these events, Sanjar marched on Khwarezm with his army in 1147. Sanjar first besieged and captured the castle of Hazorasp. Sanjar then advanced towards Urgench, the capital of Khwarezm. Realizing that he would be defeated by Sanjar, Atsiz sent envoys, begged for forgiveness and offered obedience. Thereupon, Sanjar forgave him and left him as the governor of Khwarezm.

=== Battle of Nab (1152) ===
After the Battle of Qatwan, the Ghurids led by Ala al-Din Husayn, a vassal of the Ghaznavids, captured Herat and advanced towards Balkh. Following these developments, the Seljuk commander Emir Kumac, who took action to stop the Ghurids, was defeated. Later, Ala al-Din Husayn attacked the Ghaznavids, a vassal of the Seljuks. He occupied Ghazna, the capital of the Ghaznavids, and burned the city. Later, Ala al-Din Husayn declared his independence. Following these events, Sanjar organized an expedition against Ala al-Din Husayn. The two armies met at a place called Nab near Herat on June 24, 1152. In the ensuing battle, Ala al-Din Husayn was decisively defeated and taken prisoner by Sanjar.

=== Campaign against the Nizari Ismailis (1152) ===
In 1152, Sanjar launched a campaign against the Nizari Ismailis. Sanjar's army marched on Turshēz. The Seljuk army attacked Nizari Ismaili towns and castles. Sanjar's army ravaged and occupied the Nizari Ismaili towns and castles. After dealing a heavy blow to the Nizari Ismailis, Sanjar ended the campaign and returned with his army.

=== Rebellion of Oghuz Turks (1153) ===
In 1153, Amir Qumach was delegated command as governor of Balkh. The Oghuz Turks, who were pasturing nearby paid a tribute of 20,000 sheep per year to Ahmad Sanjar in exchange for settlement, but they'd recently killed a tax collector after he mocked the Turkomen and treated them contemptuously. Qumach, an ever ambitious military leader attempted to massacre the Oghuz Turks with 12,000 cavalry, but was defeated and forced to flee to Merv.

Sanjar was present at his base when Qumach arrived, and despite pleas and offers to extend tribute by the Oghuz Turks, Qumach and numerous other amirs eventually convinced him to march out and meet them, which he did in April 1153 at the Battle of Muharram, which ended in a defeat for the Seljuks. Sanjar was captured, Qumach was killed including many of his noblemen who'd encouraged the campaign.

Sanjar's as well as the Seljuks' rule collapsed as a consequence of yet another unexpected defeat, at the hands of the Seljuks’ own tribe, the Oghuz Turks, in 1153. Sanjar was captured during the battle and held in captivity until 1156. It brought chaos to the Empire - situation later exploited by the victorious Turkmens, whose hordes would overrun Khorasan unopposed, severely damaging the province. Sanjar eventually escaped from captivity in the fall of 1156, but soon died in Merv (present-day Turkmenistan), in 1157. After his death, Turkic rulers, Turkmen tribal forces, and other secondary powers competed for Khorasan, and after a long period of confrontations, the province was finally conquered by the Ghurids in 1192, and by the Khwarazmians in the early 1200s.

== Death and legacy ==
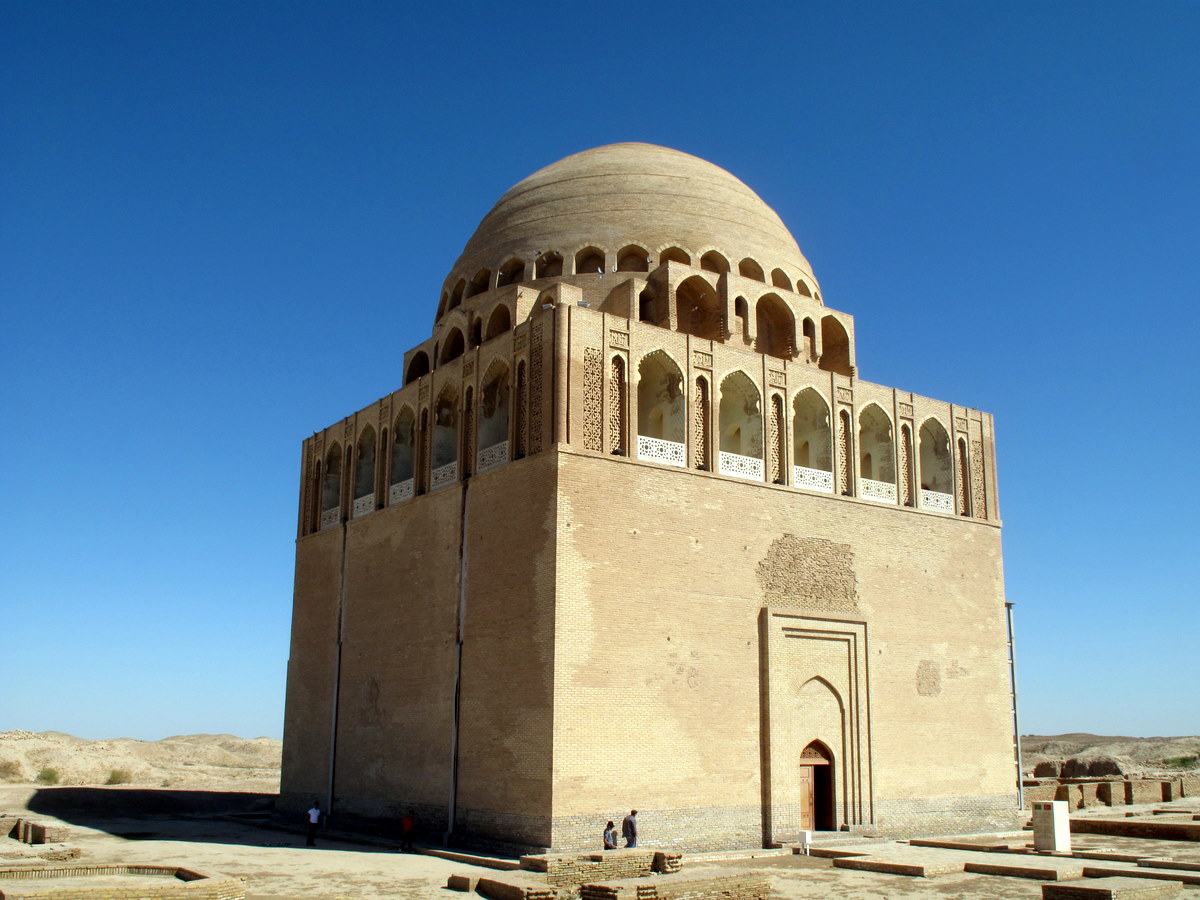
Ahmad Sanjar mausoleum in Merv (modern Mary, Turkmenistan)

Sanjar died in 1157 and was buried in Merv. His tomb was destroyed by the Mongols in 1221, during their invasion of the Khwarezmian Empire.

The death of Sanjar meant the end of the Seljuq dynasty as an empire, since they controlled only Iraq and Azerbaijan afterwards. Sanjar is considered one of the most prominent Seljuq sultans and was the longest reigning Muslim ruler until the Mongols arrived. Although of Turkic origin, Sanjar was highly Iranized, and due to his feats, even became a legendary figure like some of the mythological characters in the Shahnameh. Medieval sources described Sanjar as having "the majesty of the Khosrows and the glory of the Kayanids". Persian poetry flourished under Sanjar, and his court included some of the greatest Persian poets, such as Mu'izzi, Nizami Aruzi, and Anvari.

Sanjar was widely regarded as a pious and God-fearing ruler, with sources noting his personal ascetic practices, such as wearing simple attire. He was also a diligent student of religious knowledge and maintained close relationships with the ulema, ascetics, and hermits. This devotion was so prominent that his enemies, after his defeat and capture, specifically targeted religious scholars and government officials to express their anti-Sanjar sentiment.

Described as a king "of right opinion, sound belief, and truthful promise", Sanjar was a fervent defender of Sunni Islam. His reign was characterized by a strict adherence to the Sunna and the high road of justice. He was actively involved in combatting heresy, even being credited with saving orthodox Islam in Herat by defeating the Batini leader Habashi b. Altutiyaq.

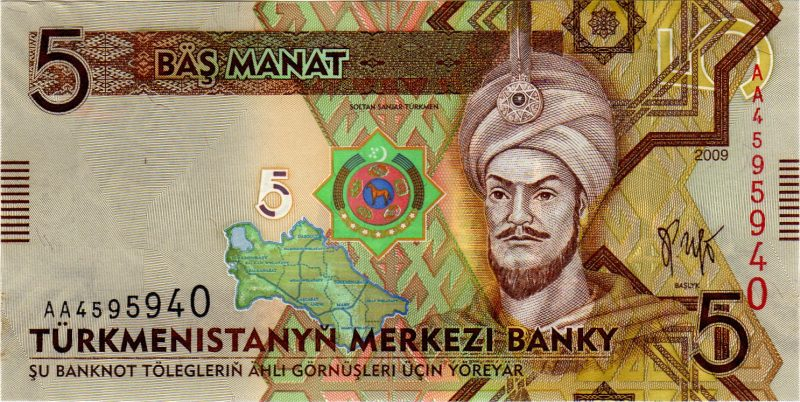
Ahmad Sanjar, as featured on the front of the 5 Turkmenistan manat banknote

== Family ==
One of his wives was Turkan Khatun. She was the daughter of Muhammad Arslan Khan, the ruler of the Kara-Khanid Khanate. She died in April 1156, and was buried in Yusuf Hamadani Mausoleum Complex in Merv. Another wife was Abkhaziyya Khatun. She was the daughter of King Demetrius I of Georgia, and the widow of his nephew Sultan Ghiyath ad-Din Mas'ud. They married after Mas'ud's death in 1152. One of Sanjar's daughters was Mah-i Mulk Khatun. She was born in 1105. In probably 1119, Sanjar married her to his nephew Mahmud II. When she died aged seventeen in 1122, Sanjar sent another daughter, Amir Sitti Khatun, to be his wife. Melik Shah III and Gawhar Nasab Khatun were the children of this union. She died in 1129. Amira Khatun, another of Sanjar's daughters married Abbasid Caliph Al-Mustarshid in 1124. Another daughter of Sanjar, Gawhar Khatun, married his nephew, Ghiyath ad-Din Mas'ud in 1134. A daughter of this union was married by Mas'ud to his nephew Dawud, son of Mahmud II. They failed to get on together, and Ma'sud gave his daughter to Dawud's brother, Muhammad II.

== Sources ==
- Bosworth, C. E. (1968). "The Political and Dynastic History of the Iranian World (A.D. 1000–1217)". In Frye, R. N. (ed.). The Cambridge History of Iran, Volume 5: The Saljuq and Mongol periods. Cambridge: Cambridge University Press. pp. 1–202. ISBN 0-521-06936-X.
- Bosworth, C. Edmund (1983). "ABŪ KĀLĪJĀR GARŠĀSP (II)". Encyclopaedia Iranica, Vol. I, Fasc. 3. London et al.: C. Edmund Bosworth. pp. 328–329.
- Bosworth, C. Edmund (2002). "GOWHAR ḴĀTUN". Encyclopaedia Iranica, Vol. XI, Fasc. 2. London et al.: C. Edmund Bosworth. p. 179.
- Bosworth, C. E (1995). The Later Ghaznavids: Splendour and Decay: The Dynasty in Afghanistan and Northern India 1040-1186. Munshiram Manoharlal Publishers Private, Limited. ISBN 9788121505772.
- Daftary, Farhad (2007). The Isma'ilis: Their History and Doctrines (2nd, revised ed.). Cambridge University Press. ISBN 978-1-139-46578-6.
- Grousset, René (1970). The Empire of the Steppes: A History of Central Asia. Rutgers University Press. pp. 1-687. ISBN 9780813513041. "false."
- Massignon, Louis (1982). The Passion of al-Hallaj, Mystic and Martyr of Islam. Vol. 2. Translated by Mason, Herbert. Princeton University Press.
- Peacock, A. C. S. (2015). The Great Seljuk Empire. Edinburgh University Press. pp. 1–378. ISBN 9780748638260.
- Safi, Omid (2006). The Politics of Knowledge in Premodern Islam: Negotiating Ideology and Religious Inquiry. University of North Carolina Press.

Preceded by Muhammad I	Sultan of the Seljuq Empire; 1118–1153	Succeeded by Divisions of Seljuq dynasty
