= Tughril II =

Seljuk sultan (r. 1132–1134)

- رکن الدنیا و الدین ابوطالب طغرل دوم بن محمد تپر

Sultan of the Seljuq Empire
- Reign: 1132 – 24 October 1134
- Predecessor: Dawud
- Successor: Ghiyath ad-Din Mas'ud
- Co-sultan: Ahmad Sanjar (1132–1134)
- Born: c. 1109
- Died: 24 October 1134 ( aged 25)
- Spouse: Mumina Khatun
- Issue: Arslan-Shah
Names
- Rukn ad-Dunya wa ad-Din Tughril II
- House: House of Seljuq
- Father: Muhammad I Tapar
- Religion: Sunni Islam

Rukn al-Dunya wa'l-Din Abu Talib Tughril bin Muhammad (c. 1109 – 24 October 1134) known as Tughril II was the Sejluk sultan of Persian Iraq briefly in 1132. He maintained power through the support of his uncle, the principal Seljuk sultan Ahmad Sanjar (r. 1118–1157); when the latter left for Transoxiana to suppress a rebellion in 1132, Tughril II lost Iraq to his rival and brother Ghiyath ad-Din Mas'ud. Tughril II briefly took refuge in the domain of the Bavandid ispahbad (ruler) Ali I (r. 1118–1142) in Mazandaran, where he stayed during the whole winter of 1132–1133. He subsequently captured the capital Hamadan, but was stricken with sickness and died on his arrival to the capital, in October/November 1134. After his death, his son Arslan was raised by the atabeg Eldiguz, who installed him on the throne in 1161.

== Family ==
His only wife was Mumina Khatun. She was the mother of his son, Arslan-Shah. After Tughril's death, Sultan Ghiyath ad-Din Mas'ud married her to Sham al-Din Eldiguz. He took her to Barda. With him, she had two sons, Atabeg Muhammad Jahan Pahlavan and Atabeg Qizil Arslan. She died in 1175–76, and was buried in her own mausoleum in Nakhchivan, Azerbaijan.

== Sources ==
- Bosworth, Clifford Edmund (1968). "The Political and Dynastic History of the Iranian World (A.D. 1000–1217)". In Boyle, John Andrew (ed.). The Cambridge History of Iran: The Saljuq and Mongol Periods. Vol. 5. Cambridge: Cambridge University Press. pp. 1–202. ISBN 0-521-06936-X.
- Bosworth, C. Edmund (1994). "Dargazīnī". In Yarshater, Ehsan (ed.). Encyclopædia Iranica. Vol. VII/1: Dārā(b)–Dastūr al-Afāżel. London and New York: Routledge & Kegan Paul. pp. 33–34. ISBN 978-1-56859-019-6.
- Houtsma, M.T. (2000). "Ṭog̲h̲ri̊l (II)". In Bearman, P. J.; Bianquis, Th.; Bosworth, C. E.; van Donzel, E. & Heinrichs, W. P. (eds.). The Encyclopaedia of Islam, Second Edition. Volume X: T–U. Leiden: E. J. Brill. p. 554. ISBN 978-90-04-11211-7.
- Peacock, A. C. S. (2015). The Great Seljuk Empire. Edinburgh University Press. pp. 1–378. ISBN 978-0-7486-3826-0.
