= Ghiyath ad-Din Mas'ud =

Seljuq Sultan (r. 1133–1152)

- غياث الدين أبو الفتح مسعود

Sultan of the Seljuq Empire
- Reign: 24 October 1134 – 10 October 1152
- Predecessor: Tughril II
- Successor: Malik-Shah III
- Co-sultan: Ahmad Sanjar (1134–1152)
- Born: c. 1107
- Died: 10 October 1152 (aged 44–45); Hamadan
- Spouse: Gawhar Khatun; Zubayda Khatun; Sufra Khatun; Mustazhiriyya Khatun; Ummuha Khatun; Arab Khatun; Abkhaziyya Khatun
- Issue: Gawhar Hatun; Malik-Shah
Names
- Ghiyath ad-Din Mas'ud
- House: House of Seljuq
- Father: Muhammad I Tapar
- Mother: Nistandar Jahan
- Religion: Sunni Islam

Ghiyath al-Dunya wa'l-Din Abu'l-Fath Mas'ud bin Muhammad (c. 1107 – 10 October 1152) was the Seljuq Sultan of Iraq and western Persia in 1133–1152.

== Biography ==
=== Accession and reign ===
Ghiyath ad-Din Masud was the son of sultan Muhammad I Tapar and his wife Nistandar Jahan also known as Sarjahan Khatun. At the age of twelve (1120–1121), he rebelled unsuccessfully against his elder brother, Mahmud II, who however forgave him. At Mahmud's death in 1131, the power was contended between Mahmud's son, Dawud, Masud, whose powerbase was in Iraq, Seljuq-Shah (in Fars and Khuzistan) and Toghrul II. In 1133 Masud was able to obtain recognition as sultan from the emirs of Baghdad, and to receive the investiture by caliph al-Mustarshid. Toghrul, who controlling the eastern provinces of the western Seljuq, launched a military campaign but was defeated by Masud in May 1133. Toghrul died in 1134. Also in 1133 Mas'ud supported Zengi, besieged by al-Mustarshid's troops in Mosul.

In 1135 caliph al-Mustarshid contested his authority but, on 14 June of that year, he was defeated and made prisoner at Daimarg, between Hamadan and Baghdad, and killed two months later by the Hashshashins. As al-Mustarshid's successor, al-Rashid, also rebelled with the support of Zengi, Mas'ud besieged him in Baghdad, forcing him to flee to Mosul, where he was also killed by the Hashshashins. Although able to ensure control over Iraq, Mas'ud's power over the rest of the Seljuk Empire was uncertain: apart from Khorasan and Transoxiana, which had been long time under the control of his uncle Ahmed Sanjar, Dawud kept control over Azerbaijan for several years, while weastern Persia was effectively ruled by emir Bozaba until Mas'ud defeated him, together with other emirs, in 1147. In 1148 Mas'ud faced another coalition against him, this time aiming to place Malik Shah on the throne in his place.

During his troublesome reign, Masud was forced to accept to delegate his authority to numerous emirs with the iqta', a tax institution which reduced the imperial incomes. Other became effectively independent sultans, such as Zengi. This caused, according to historian ibn al-Athir, the beginning of the steep decline of the Seljuq Empire.

=== Death and legacy ===
Mas'ud died at Hamadan in 1152. He was briefly succeeded by Malik-Shah III, who had been forgiven by Masud, and also given one the sultan's daughters as spouse.

Mas'ud was a ruler who held a positive religious reputation among his contemporaries. He was described as a "friend of the 'alim and a giver to the religious poor". His affection for the religious community was a defining feature of his character. The Shaykhs of Baghdad reportedly said that Mas'ud loved to visit the Ulama and the righteous, and to seek knowledge from the shaykhs. He was also noted for bearing "love toward the insane and the lunatic".

== Family ==
One of Mas'ud's wives was Gawhar Khatun, the daughter of Sultan Ahmad Sanjar. They married in 1134, after his accession to the throne. Gawhar Khatun, the daughter of this union was married by Mas'ud to his nephew Sultan Dawud, son of Sultan Mahmud II. They failed to get on together, and Mas'ud gave her to Dawud's brother, Sultan Muhammad II. Another wife was Zubayda Khatun, the daughter of Sultan Berkyaruq. Described as lovely and praised for her beauty, she dominated Mas'ud. She died in 1138. In October 1136, he gave one of his daughters in marriage to Sadaqa ibn Dubays ibn Sadaqa of the Banu Mazyad, and in January–February 1138, he himself married Dubays ibn Sadaqa's daughter Sufra Khatun, whose mother Sharaf Khatun, was the daughter of Amid al-Dawla ibn Jahir and his wife, Zubaida Khatun (died 1077), the daughter of Nizam al-Mulk. Around the same time, he also married Amid al-Dawla ibn Jahir's daughter Ummuha Khatun. In May–June 1138, he married Mustazhiriyya Khatun, the daughter of his uncle Qavurt. With her, he had a son, born in 1139. Another wife was Arab Khatun. She was the mother of Mas'ud's son, Malik-Shah. In March–April 1137, he married his sister Fatima Khatun to Abbasid Caliph Al-Muqtafi, and in 1140, he himself married the caliph's daughter Zubaydah. Her dowry was one hundred thousand dinars. The wedding procession was delayed for five years because of her young age. However, the marriage was never consummated because of Mas'ud's ultimate death. Another wife was Abkhaziyya Khatun. She was a daughter of King Demetrius I of Georgia. They married in 1143. Another daughter of Mas'ud married his nephew and successor Sultan Malik-Shah III.

== Sources ==
- Bosworth, E. (2000). The History of the Seljuq Turks: The Saljuq-nama of Zahir al-Din Nishpuri. Taylor & Francis. ISBN 978-1-136-75257-5.
- Lambton, A.K.S. (1988). Continuity and Change in Medieval Persia. Bibliotheca Persica. Bibliotheca Persica. ISBN 978-0-88706-133-2.
- Richards, D.S. (2010). The Chronicle of Ibn Al-Athir for the Crusading Period from Al-Kamil Fi'L-Ta'Rikh.: The Years 491-541/1097-1146 the Coming of the Franks and the Muslim Response. Crusade texts in translation. Ashgate. ISBN 978-0-7546-6950-0.

Preceded by Toghrul II	Sultan of Great Seljuq; 1133–1152	Succeeded by Malik Shah III
