= August 18 =

August 18 this year in various calendars
- Tuesday, 18 August 2026
Akan	Kurubene
Armenian	29 Nawasardi 1476
Aztec	Pānquetzaliztli 20, 13 Tōchtli
Babylonian	4 Abu, 2337 SE
Balinese pawukon	Menga, Pasah, Laba, Paing, Paniron, Anggara of Medangkungan, Brahma, Urungan, Suka
Bengali	3 Bhadro, BS 1433
Chinese	Yang Wood Rat・Wings Mansion; Fire Horse Year, Month 7, Day 6 (Liqiu, 5 days until Chushu)
Common Era	18 August 2026 CE
Coptic	12 Mesori, AM 1742
Egyptian	4 Tybi, 2775 NE
Ethiopian	12 Naḥasē, 2018 Amätä Məhrät
French Republican	Décade I, Primidi de Fructidor de l'Année 234 de la République
Gregorian	18 August, AD 2026
Hebrew	5 Elul, AM 5786
Hindu	Citrā・Śubha; Solar: 2 Bhādrapada, 1948 SE; Lunisolar: Ṣaṣṭhī, Śukla pakṣa of Śrāvaṇa, 2083 VE; Rāudra・5127 KY・1,872,805
Icelandic	Þriðjudagur, 24 Heyannir 2026
Islamic	4 Rabi' al-awwal, AH 1448 (using tabular method)
ISO week date	2026-W34-2
Japanese	6 Fumizuki, Reiwa 8 (Risshū, 5 days until Shosho)
Julian	5 August, AD 2026 (AM 7534)
Julian day	2461271
Korean	6 Wonsungidal, 4359 DE
Maya	13.0.13.15.8; 1 Mol, 13 Lamat
Roman	Nonis Augustis, MMDCCLXXIX AUC
Solar Hijri	27 Mordad, SH 1405
Tibetan	6 gro bzhin, me pho rta 2153 or 1772 or 1000

<<	August					>>
Su	Mo	Tu	We	Th	Fr	Sa
						1
2	3	4	5	6	7	8
9	10	11	12	13	14	15
16	17	18	19	20	21	22
23	24	25	26	27	28	29
30	31
2026

August 18 in recent years
2026 (Tuesday)
2025 (Monday)
2024 (Sunday)
2023 (Friday)
2022 (Thursday)
2021 (Wednesday)
2020 (Tuesday)
2019 (Sunday)
2018 (Saturday)
2017 (Friday)

August 18 is the 230th day of the year (231st in leap years) in the Gregorian calendar; 135 days remain until the end of the year.

== Events ==
=== Pre-1600 ===
- 684 – Battle of Marj Rahit: Umayyad partisans defeat the supporters of Ibn al-Zubayr and cement Umayyad control of Syria.
- 707 – Princess Abe accedes to the imperial Japanese throne as Empress Genmei.
- 1136 – Following the surrender of Baghdad, Seljuk Sultan Mas'ud replaces Abbasid caliph Al-Rashid Billah with his uncle Al-Muqtafi.
- 1304 – The Battle of Mons-en-Pévèle is fought to a draw between the French army and the Flemish militias.
- 1487 – The Siege of Málaga ends with the taking of the city by Castilian and Aragonese forces.
- 1492 – The first grammar of the Spanish language (Gramática de la lengua castellana) is presented to Queen Isabella I.
- 1572 – The Huguenot King Henry III of Navarre marries the Catholic Margaret of Valois, ostensibly to reconcile the feuding Protestants and Catholics of France.
- 1590 – John White, the governor of the Roanoke Colony, returns from a supply trip to England and finds his settlement deserted.

=== 1601–1900 ===
- 1612 – The trials of the Pendle witches and Samlesbury witches, one of England's most famous witch trials, begin at the Lancaster Assizes.
- 1634 – Father Urbain Grandier, accused and convicted of sorcery, is burned alive in Loudun, France.
- 1721 – The city of Shamakhi in Safavid Shirvan is sacked.
- 1759 – Beginning of the battle of Lagos, in which a British fleet defeats a French fleet trying to slip through Gibraltar.
- 1783 – A huge fireball meteor is seen across Great Britain as it passes over the east coast.
- 1809 – The Senate of Finland is established in the Grand Duchy of Finland after the official adoption of the Statute of the Government Council by Tsar Alexander I of Russia.
- 1826 – Major Gordon Laing becomes the first European to enter Timbuktu.
- 1838 – The Wilkes Expedition, which would explore the Puget Sound and Antarctica, weighs anchor at Hampton Roads.
- 1864 – American Civil War: Battle of Globe Tavern: Union forces try to cut a vital Confederate supply-line into Petersburg, Virginia, by attacking the Wilmington and Weldon Railroad.
- 1868 – French astronomer Pierre Janssen discovers helium.
- 1870 – Franco-Prussian War: Battle of Gravelotte is fought.
- 1877 – American astronomer Asaph Hall discovers Phobos, one of Mars's moons.
- 1891 – A major hurricane strikes Martinique, leaving 700 dead.

=== 1901–present ===
- 1903 – German engineer Karl Jatho allegedly flies his self-made, motored gliding airplane four months before the first flight of the Wright brothers.
- 1917 – A Great Fire in Thessaloniki, Greece, destroys 32% of the city leaving 70,000 individuals homeless.
- 1920 – The Nineteenth Amendment to the United States Constitution is ratified, guaranteeing women's suffrage.
- 1923 – The first British Track and Field championships for women are held in London, Great Britain.
- 1933 – The Volksempfänger is first presented to the German public at a radio exhibition; the presiding Nazi Minister of Propaganda, Joseph Goebbels, delivers an accompanying speech heralding the radio as the 'eighth great power'.
- 1937 – A lightning strike starts the Blackwater Fire of 1937 in Shoshone National Forest, killing 15 firefighters within three days and prompting the United States Forest Service to develop their smokejumper program.
- 1938 – The Thousand Islands Bridge, connecting New York, United States, with Ontario, Canada, over the Saint Lawrence River, is dedicated by U.S. President Franklin D. Roosevelt.
- 1940 – World War II: The Hardest Day air battle, part of the Battle of Britain, takes place. At that point, it is the largest aerial engagement in history with heavy losses sustained on both sides.
- 1945 – Sukarno takes office as the first president of Indonesia, following the country's declaration of independence the previous day.
- 1945 – Soviet-Japanese War: Battle of Shumshu: Soviet forces land at Takeda Beach on Shumshu Island and launch the Battle of Shumshu; the Soviet Union's Invasion of the Kuril Islands commences.
- 1949 – Kemi strike: Two protesters die in the scuffle between the police and the strikers' protest procession in Kemi, Finland.
- 1950 – Julien Lahaut, the chairman of the Communist Party of Belgium, is assassinated. The Party newspaper blames royalists and Rexists.
- 1958 – Vladimir Nabokov's controversial novel Lolita is published in the United States.
- 1958 – Brojen Das from Bangladesh swims across the English Channel in a competition as the first Bengali and the first Asian to do so, placing first among the 39 competitors.
- 1963 – Civil rights movement: James Meredith becomes the first African American to graduate from the University of Mississippi.
- 1965 – Vietnam War: Operation Starlite begins: United States Marines destroy a Viet Cong stronghold on the Van Tuong peninsula in the first major American ground battle of the war.
- 1966 – Vietnam War: The Battle of Long Tan ensues after a patrol from the 6th Battalion, Royal Australian Regiment clashes with a Viet Cong force in Phước Tuy Province.
- 1971 – Vietnam War: Australia and New Zealand decide to withdraw their troops from Vietnam.
- 1973 – Aeroflot Flight A-13 crashes after takeoff from Baku-Bina International Airport in Azerbaijan, killing 56 people and injuring eight.
- 1976 – The Korean axe murder incident in Panmunjom results in the deaths of two US Army officers.
- 1976 – The Soviet Union's robotic probe Luna 24 successfully lands on the Moon.
- 1977 – Steve Biko is arrested at a police roadblock under Terrorism Act No. 83 of 1967 in King William's Town, South Africa. He later dies from injuries sustained during this arrest, bringing attention to South Africa's apartheid policies.
- 1983 – Hurricane Alicia hits the Texas coast, killing 21 people and causing over US$1 billion in damage (1983 dollars).
- 1989 – Leading presidential hopeful Luis Carlos Galán is assassinated near Bogotá in Colombia.
- 1993 – American International Airways Flight 808 crashes at Leeward Point Field at Guantanamo Bay Naval Base in Guantánamo Bay, Cuba, injuring the three crew members.
- 2003 – One-year-old Zachary Turner is murdered in Newfoundland by his mother, who was awarded custody despite facing trial for the murder of Zachary's father. The case was documented in the film Dear Zachary and led to reform of Canada's bail laws.
- 2005 – A massive power blackout hits the Indonesian island of Java; affecting almost 100 million people, it is one of the largest and most widespread power outages in history.
- 2008 – The President of Pakistan, Pervez Musharraf, resigns under threat of impeachment.
- 2008 – War of Afghanistan: The Uzbin Valley ambush occurs.
- 2011 – A terrorist attack on Israel's Highway 12 near the Egyptian border kills 16 and injures 40.
- 2017 – The Turku terror attack occurs in Finland when a knifeman kills two and injures eight.
- 2019 – One hundred activists, officials, and other concerned citizens in Iceland hold a funeral for Okjökull glacier, which has completely melted after having once covered six square miles (15.5 km^{2}).

== Births ==
=== Pre-1600 ===
- 1305 – Ashikaga Takauji, Japanese Shōgun (died 1358)
- 1450 – Marko Marulić, Croatian poet and author (died 1524)
- 1458 – Lorenzo Pucci, Catholic cardinal (died 1531)
- 1497 – Francesco Canova da Milano, Italian composer (died 1543)
- 1542 – Charles Neville, 6th Earl of Westmorland (died 1601)
- 1579 – Countess Charlotte Flandrina of Nassau (died 1640)
- 1587 – Virginia Dare, granddaughter of Governor John White of the Colony of Roanoke, first child born to English parents in the Americas (date of death unknown)
- 1596 – Jean Bolland, Flemish priest and hagiographer (died 1665)

=== 1601–1900 ===
- 1605 – Henry Hammond, English churchman and theologian (died 1660)
- 1606 – Maria Anna of Spain (died 1646)
- 1629 – Agneta Horn, Swedish writer (died 1672)
- 1657 – Ferdinando Galli-Bibiena, Italian architect and painter (died 1743)
- 1685 – Brook Taylor, English mathematician and theorist (died 1731)
- 1692 – Louis Henri, Duke of Bourbon (died 1740)
- 1700 – Baji Rao I, first Peshwa of Maratha Empire (died 1740)
- 1720 – Laurence Shirley, 4th Earl Ferrers, English politician (died 1760)
- 1750 – Antonio Salieri, Italian composer and conductor (died 1825)
- 1754 – François, marquis de Chasseloup-Laubat, French general and engineer (died 1833)
- 1774 – Meriwether Lewis, American soldier, explorer, and politician (died 1809)
- 1792 – John Russell, 1st Earl Russell, English politician, Prime Minister of the United Kingdom (died 1878)
- 1803 – Nathan Clifford, American lawyer, jurist, and politician, 19th United States Attorney General (died 1881)
- 1807 – B. T. Finniss, Australian politician, 1st Premier of South Australia (died 1893)
- 1819 – Grand Duchess Maria Nikolaevna of Russia (died 1876)
- 1822 – Isaac P. Rodman, American general and politician (died 1862)
- 1830 – Franz Joseph I, Emperor of Austria from 1848-1916 (died 1916)
- 1831 – Ernest Noel, Scottish businessman and politician (died 1931)
- 1834 – Marshall Field, American businessman, founded Marshall Field's (died 1906)
- 1841 – William Halford, English-American lieutenant, Medal of Honor recipient (died 1919)
- 1855 – Alfred Wallis, English painter and illustrator (died 1942)
- 1856 – Ahad Ha'am, Hebrew essayist and journalist and pre-state Zionist thinker (died 1927)
- 1857 – Libert H. Boeynaems, Belgian-American bishop and missionary (died 1926)
- 1866 – Mahboob Ali Khan, 6th Nizam of Hyderabad (died 1911)
- 1869 – Carl Rungius, German-American painter and educator (died 1959)
- 1870 – Lavr Kornilov, Russian general and explorer (died 1918)
- 1879 – Alexander Rodzyanko, Russian general (died 1970)
- 1885 – Nettie Palmer, Australian poet and critic (died 1964)
- 1887 – John Anthony Sydney Ritson, English rugby player, mines inspector, engineer and professor of mining (died 1957)
- 1890 – Walther Funk, German economist and politician, Reich Minister of Economics, convicted Nuremberg war criminal (died 1960)
- 1893 – Burleigh Grimes, American baseball player and manager (died 1985)
- 1893 – Ernest MacMillan, Canadian conductor and composer (died 1973)
- 1896 – Jack Pickford, Canadian-American actor and director (died 1933)
- 1898 – Clemente Biondetti, Italian race car driver (died 1955)
- 1900 – Ruth Bonner, Soviet Communist activist, sentenced to a labor camp during Joseph Stalin's Great Purge (died 1987)
- 1900 – Ruth Norman, American religious leader (died 1993)

=== 1901–present ===
- 1902 – Adamson-Eric, Estonian painter (died 1968)
- 1902 – Margaret Murie, American environmentalist and author (died 2003)
- 1903 – Lucienne Boyer, French singer (died 1983)
- 1904 – Max Factor, Jr., American businessman (died 1996)
- 1905 – Enoch Light, American bandleader, violinist, and recording engineer (died 1978)
- 1906 – Marcel Carné, French director and screenwriter (died 1996)
- 1906 – Curtis Jones, American blues pianist and singer (died 1971)
- 1908 – Edgar Faure, French historian and politician, 139th Prime Minister of France (died 1988)
- 1908 – Olav H. Hauge, Norwegian poet and gardener (died 1994)
- 1908 – Bill Merritt, New Zealand cricketer and sportscaster (died 1977)
- 1909 – Gérard Filion, Canadian businessman and journalist (died 2005)
- 1910 – Herman Berlinski, Polish-American pianist, composer, and conductor (died 2001)
- 1910 – Robert Winters, Canadian colonel, engineer, and politician, 26th Canadian Minister of Public Works (died 1969)
- 1911 – Amelia Boynton Robinson, American activist (died 2015)
- 1911 – Klara Dan von Neumann, Hungarian computer scientist and programmer (died 1963)
- 1911 – Maria Ulfah Santoso, Indonesian politician and women's rights activist (died 1988)
- 1912 – Otto Ernst Remer, German general (died 1997)
- 1913 – Romain Maes, Belgian cyclist (died 1983)
- 1914 – Lucy Ozarin, United States Navy lieutenant commander and psychiatrist (died 2017)
- 1915 – Max Lanier, American baseball player and manager (died 2007)
- 1916 – Neagu Djuvara, Romanian historian, journalist, and diplomat (died 2018)
- 1916 – Moura Lympany, English pianist (died 2005)
- 1917 – Caspar Weinberger, American captain, lawyer, and politician, 15th United States Secretary of Defense (died 2006)
- 1918 – Cisco Houston, American singer-songwriter and guitarist (died 1961)
- 1919 – Wally Hickel, American businessman and politician, 2nd Governor of Alaska (died 2010)
- 1920 – Godfrey Evans, English cricketer (died 1999)
- 1920 – Bob Kennedy, American baseball player and manager (died 2005)
- 1920 – Shelley Winters, American actress (died 2006)
- 1921 – Lydia Litvyak, Russian lieutenant and pilot (died 1943)
- 1921 – Zdzisław Żygulski, Polish historian and academic (died 2015)
- 1922 – Alain Robbe-Grillet, French director, screenwriter, and novelist (died 2008)
- 1923 – Katherine Victor, American actress (died 2004)
- 1925 – Brian Aldiss, English author and critic (died 2017)
- 1925 – Pierre Grondin, Canadian surgeon and academic (died 2006)
- 1925 – Anis Mansour, Egyptian journalist and author (died 2011)
- 1927 – Rosalynn Carter, 41st First Lady of the United States (died 2023)
- 1928 – Marge Schott, American businesswoman (died 2004)
- 1928 – Sonny Til, American R&B singer (died 1981)
- 1929 – Hugues Aufray, French singer-songwriter
- 1930 – Liviu Librescu, Romanian-American engineer and academic (died 2007)
- 1930 – Rafael Pineda Ponce, Honduran academic and politician (died 2014)
- 1931 – Bramwell Tillsley, Canadian 14th General of The Salvation Army (died 2019)
- 1931 – Hans van Mierlo, Dutch journalist and politician, Deputy Prime Minister of the Netherlands (died 2010)
- 1931 – Grant Williams, American film, theater and television actor (died 1985)
- 1932 – Luc Montagnier, French virologist and academic, Nobel Prize laureate (died 2022)
- 1933 – Just Fontaine, Moroccan-French footballer and manager (died 2023)
- 1933 – Roman Polanski, French-Polish director, producer, screenwriter, and actor
- 1933 – Frank Salemme, American gangster and hitman (died 2022)
- 1934 – Vincent Bugliosi, American lawyer and author (died 2015)
- 1934 – Roberto Clemente, Puerto Rican-American baseball player and soldier (died 1972)
- 1934 – Gulzar, Indian poet, lyricist and film director
- 1934 – Rafer Johnson, American decathlete and actor (died 2020)
- 1934 – Michael May, German-Swiss race car driver and engineer
- 1935 – Gail Fisher, American actress (died 2000)
- 1935 – Hifikepunye Pohamba, Namibian lawyer and politician, 2nd President of Namibia
- 1936 – Robert Redford, American actor, director, and producer (died 2025)
- 1937 – Sheila Cassidy, English physician and author
- 1939 – Maxine Brown, American soul/R&B singer-songwriter
- 1939 – Robert Horton, English businessman (died 2011)
- 1939 – Johnny Preston, American pop singer (died 2011)
- 1940 – Adam Makowicz, Polish-Canadian pianist and composer
- 1940 – Gil Whitney, American journalist (died 1982)
- 1942 – Henry G. Sanders, American actor
- 1943 – Martin Mull, American actor and comedian (died 2024)
- 1943 – Gianni Rivera, Italian footballer and politician
- 1943 – Carl Wayne, English singer and actor (died 2004)
- 1944 – Paula Danziger, American author (died 2004)
- 1944 – Robert Hitchcock, Australian sculptor and illustrator
- 1945 – Sarah Dash, American singer-songwriter and actress (died 2021)
- 1945 – Värner Lootsmann, Estonian lawyer and politician
- 1945 – Lewis Burwell Puller, Jr., American soldier, lawyer, and author (died 1994)
- 1948 – James Jones, English bishop
- 1948 – John Scarlett, English intelligence officer, former head of MI6
- 1949 – Nigel Griggs, English bass player, songwriter, and producer
- 1950 – Dennis Elliott, English drummer and sculptor
- 1952 – Elayne Boosler, American actress, director, and screenwriter
- 1952 – Patrick Swayze, American actor and dancer (died 2009)
- 1952 – Ricardo Villa, Argentinian footballer and coach
- 1953 – Louie Gohmert, American captain, lawyer, and politician
- 1953 – Marvin Isley, American R&B bass player and songwriter (died 2010)
- 1954 – Umberto Guidoni, Italian astrophysicist, astronaut, and politician
- 1955 – Bruce Benedict, American baseball player and coach
- 1955 – Taher Elgamal, Egyptian-American cryptographer
- 1956 – John Debney, American composer and conductor
- 1956 – Sandeep Patil, Indian cricketer and coach
- 1956 – Jon Schwartz, American drummer and producer
- 1956 – Kelly Willard, American singer-songwriter
- 1956 – Rainer Woelki, German cardinal
- 1957 – Carole Bouquet, French actress
- 1957 – Tan Dun, Chinese composer
- 1957 – Denis Leary, American comedian, actor, producer, and screenwriter
- 1957 – Ron Strykert, Australian singer-songwriter, guitarist, and producer
- 1958 – Didier Auriol, French race car driver
- 1958 – Madeleine Stowe, American actress
- 1959 – Tom Prichard, American wrestler and trainer
- 1960 – Mike LaValliere, American baseball player
- 1960 – Fat Lever, American basketball player and sportscaster
- 1961 – Huw Edwards, Welsh journalist and author
- 1961 – Timothy Geithner, American banker and politician, 75th United States Secretary of the Treasury
- 1961 – Bob Woodruff, American journalist and author
- 1962 – Felipe Calderón, Mexican lawyer and politician, 56th President of Mexico
- 1962 – Geoff Courtnall, Canadian ice hockey player and coach
- 1962 – Adam Storke, American actor
- 1964 – Craig Bierko, American actor and singer
- 1964 – Andi Deris, German singer and songwriter
- 1964 – Mark Sargent, Australian rugby league player
- 1964 – Kenny Walker, American basketball player and sportscaster
- 1965 – Ikue Ōtani, Japanese voice actress
- 1966 – Gustavo Charif, Argentinian director and producer
- 1967 – Daler Mehndi, Indian Punjabi singer, songwriter and record producer
- 1967 – Brian Michael Bendis, American author and illustrator
- 1969 – Everlast, American singer, rapper, and musician
- 1969 – Masta Killa, American rapper
- 1969 – Mark Kuhlmann, German rugby player and coach
- 1969 – Edward Norton, American actor
- 1969 – Christian Slater, American actor and producer
- 1970 – Jason Furman, American economist and politician
- 1970 – Malcolm-Jamal Warner, American actor and producer (died 2025)
- 1971 – Patrik Andersson, Swedish footballer
- 1971 – Richard David James, English musician and record producer
- 1974 – Nicole Krauss, American novelist and critic
- 1975 – Kaitlin Olson, American actress and comedian
- 1976 – Paraskevas Antzas, Greek footballer (died 2026)
- 1977 – Even Kruse Skatrud, Norwegian musician and educator
- 1978 – Andy Samberg, American actor and comedian
- 1979 – Stuart Dew, Australian footballer
- 1980 – Esteban Cambiasso, Argentinian footballer
- 1980 – Rob Nguyen, Australian race car driver
- 1980 – Ryan O'Hara, Australian rugby league player
- 1980 – Bart Scott, American football player
- 1980 – Jeremy Shockey, American football player
- 1981 – César Delgado, Argentinian footballer
- 1981 – Dimitris Salpingidis, Greek footballer
- 1983 – Mika, Lebanese-born English recording artist and singer-songwriter
- 1983 – Cameron White, Australian cricketer
- 1984 – Sigourney Bandjar, Dutch footballer
- 1984 – Robert Huth, German footballer
- 1985 – Inge Dekker, Dutch swimmer
- 1985 – Bryan Ruiz, Costa Rican footballer
- 1986 – Evan Gattis, American baseball player
- 1986 – Ross McCormack, Scottish footballer
- 1987 – Joanna Jędrzejczyk, Polish mixed martial artist
- 1987 – Justin Wilson, American baseball player
- 1988 – Jack Hobbs, English footballer
- 1988 – Eggert Jónsson, Icelandic footballer
- 1988 – G-Dragon, South Korean rapper, singer-songwriter and record producer
- 1989 – Anna Akana, American actress, comedian, musician, and YouTuber
- 1989 – Yu Mengyu, Singaporean table tennis player
- 1991 – Liz Cambage, Australian basketball player
- 1991 – Richard Harmon, Canadian actor
- 1992 – Elizabeth Beisel, American swimmer
- 1992 – Bogdan Bogdanović, Serbian basketball player
- 1992 – Frances Bean Cobain, American visual artist and model
- 1993 – Jung Eun-ji, South Korean singer-songwriter
- 1993 – Maia Mitchell, Australian actress and singer
- 1994 – Madelaine Petsch, American actress and YouTuber
- 1994 – Morgan Sanson, French footballer
- 1994 – Seiya Suzuki, Japanese baseball player
- 1995 – Alīna Fjodorova, Latvian figure skater
- 1995 – Parker McKenna Posey, American actress
- 1997 – Josephine Langford, Australian actress
- 1997 – Renato Sanches, Portuguese footballer
- 1998 – Brian To'o, Australian-Samoan rugby league player
- 1998 – Clairo, American singer-songwriter
- 1998 – Nick Fuentes, American far-right political commentator
- 1999 – Cassius Stanley, American basketball player
- 2002 – Bart Verbruggen, Dutch footballer
- 2004 – Kevin McGonigle, American baseball player
- 2006 – Summer McIntosh, Canadian swimmer

== Deaths ==
=== Pre-1600 ===
- 353 – Decentius, Roman usurper
- 440 – Pope Sixtus III
- 472 – Ricimer, Roman general and politician (born 405)
- 670 – Fiacre, Irish hermit
- 673 – Kim Yu-shin, general of Silla (born 595)
- 849 – Walafrid Strabo, German monk and theologian (born 808)
- 911 – Al-Hadi ila'l-Haqq Yahya, first Zaydi Imam of Yemen (born 859)
- 1095 – King Olaf I of Denmark
- 1211 – Narapatisithu, king of Burma (born 1150)
- 1258 – Theodore II Laskaris, emperor of Nicea (Byzantine emperor in exile)
- 1276 – Pope Adrian V (born 1220)
- 1318 – Clare of Montefalco, Italian nun and saint (born 1268)
- 1430 – Thomas de Ros, 8th Baron de Ros, English soldier and politician (born 1406)
- 1500 – Alfonso of Aragon, Spanish prince (born 1481)
- 1502 – Knut Alvsson, Norwegian nobleman and politician (born 1455)
- 1503 – Pope Alexander VI (born 1431)
- 1550 – Antonio Ferramolino, Italian architect and military engineer
- 1559 – Pope Paul IV (born 1476)
- 1563 – Étienne de La Boétie, French judge and philosopher (born 1530)
- 1600 – Sebastiano Montelupi, Italian businessman (born 1516)

=== 1601–1900 ===
- 1613 – Giovanni Artusi, Italian composer and theorist (born 1540)
- 1620 – Wanli Emperor of China (born 1563)
- 1625 – Edward la Zouche, 11th Baron Zouche, English diplomat (born 1556)
- 1634 – Urbain Grandier, French priest (born 1590)
- 1642 – Guido Reni, Italian painter and educator (born 1575)
- 1648 – Ibrahim of the Ottoman Empire (born 1615)
- 1683 – Charles Hart, English actor (born 1625)
- 1707 – William Cavendish, 1st Duke of Devonshire, English soldier and politician, Lord Lieutenant of Derbyshire (born 1640)
- 1712 – Richard Savage, 4th Earl Rivers, English general and politician, Lord Lieutenant of Essex (born 1660)
- 1765 – Francis I, Holy Roman Emperor (born 1708)
- 1815 – Chauncey Goodrich, American lawyer and politician, 8th Lieutenant Governor of Connecticut (born 1759)
- 1823 – André-Jacques Garnerin, French balloonist and the inventor of the frameless parachute (born 1769)
- 1842 – Louis de Freycinet, French explorer and navigator (born 1779)
- 1850 – Honoré de Balzac, French novelist and playwright (born 1799)
- 1852 – James Finlayson, Scottish Quaker (born 1772)
- 1886 – Eli Whitney Blake, American inventor, invented the Mortise lock (born 1795)
- 1890 – Mother Solomon, Wyandot activist (born 1816)

=== 1901–present ===
- 1919 – Joseph E. Seagram, Canadian businessman and politician, founded the Seagram Company (born 1841)
- 1940 – Walter Chrysler, American businessman, founded Chrysler (born 1875)
- 1942 – Erwin Schulhoff, Austro-Czech composer and pianist (born 1894)
- 1943 – Ali-Agha Shikhlinski, Azerbaijani general (born 1865)
- 1944 – Ernst Thälmann, German soldier and politician (born 1886)
- 1945 – Subhas Chandra Bose, Indian activist and politician (born 1897)
- 1946 – Che Yaoxian, Chinese communist (born 1894)
- 1946 – Luo Shiwen, Chinese communist (born 1904)
- 1949 – Paul Mares, American trumpet player and bandleader (born 1900)
- 1950 – Julien Lahaut, Belgian soldier and politician (born 1884)
- 1952 – Alberto Hurtado, Chilean priest, lawyer, and saint (born 1901)
- 1961 – Learned Hand, American lawyer, jurist, and philosopher (born 1872)
- 1964 – Hildegard Trabant, Berlin Wall victim (born 1927)
- 1968 – Arthur Marshall, American pianist and composer (born 1881)
- 1975 – Odd Lindbäck-Larsen, Norwegian Army general and war historian (born 1897)
- 1979 – Vasantrao Naik, Indian politician (born 1913)
- 1981 – Anita Loos, American author and screenwriter (born 1889)
- 1983 – Nikolaus Pevsner, German-English historian and scholar (born 1902)
- 1986 – Harun Babunagari, Bangladeshi Islamic scholar and educationist (born 1902)
- 1990 – B. F. Skinner, American psychologist and philosopher, invented the Skinner box (born 1904)
- 1994 – Francis Raymond Shea, American bishop (born 1913)
- 1998 – Persis Khambatta, Indian model and actress, Femina Miss India 1965 (born 1948)
- 2001 – David Peakall, English chemist and toxicologist (born 1931)
- 2002 – Dean Riesner, American actor and screenwriter (born 1918)
- 2003 – Tony Jackson, English singer and bassist (born 1938)
- 2004 – Elmer Bernstein, American composer and conductor (born 1922)
- 2004 – Hiram Fong, American soldier and politician (born 1906)
- 2005 – Chri$ Ca$h, American wrestler (born 1982)
- 2006 – Fernand Gignac, French Canadian singer and actor (born 1934).
- 2006 – Ken Kearney, Australian rugby player (born 1924)
- 2007 – Michael Deaver, American soldier and politician, White House Deputy Chief of Staff (born 1938)
- 2007 – Magdalen Nabb, English author (born 1947)
- 2009 – Kim Dae-jung, South Korean lieutenant and politician, 15th President of South Korea, Nobel Prize laureate (born 1925)
- 2009 – Rose Friedman, Ukrainian-American economist and author (born 1910)
- 2009 – Robert Novak, American journalist and author (born 1931)
- 2010 – Hal Connolly, American hammer thrower and coach (born 1931)
- 2010 – Benjamin Kaplan, American scholar and jurist (born 1911)
- 2012 – Harrison Begay, American painter (born 1917)
- 2012 – John Kovatch, American football player (born 1920)
- 2012 – Scott McKenzie, American singer-songwriter and guitarist (born 1939)
- 2012 – Ra. Ki. Rangarajan, Indian journalist and author (born 1927)
- 2012 – Jesse Robredo, Filipino public servant and politician, 23rd Secretary of the Interior and Local Government (born 1958)
- 2013 – Josephine D'Angelo, American baseball player (born 1924)
- 2013 – Jean Kahn, French lawyer and activist (born 1929)
- 2013 – Albert Murray, American author and critic (born 1916)
- 2014 – Gordon Faber, American soldier and politician, 39th Mayor of Hillsboro, Oregon (born 1930)
- 2014 – Jim Jeffords, American captain, lawyer, and politician (born 1934)
- 2014 – Levente Lengyel, Hungarian chess player (born 1933)
- 2014 – Don Pardo, American radio and television announcer (born 1918)
- 2015 – Khaled al-Asaad, Syrian archaeologist and author (born 1932)
- 2015 – Roger Smalley, English-Australian pianist, composer, and conductor (born 1943)
- 2015 – Suvra Mukherjee, wife of Indian president Pranab Mukherjee (born 1940)
- 2015 – Louis Stokes, American lawyer and politician (born 1925)
- 2015 – Bud Yorkin, American director, producer, and screenwriter (born 1926)
- 2016 – Ernst Nolte, German historian (born 1923)
- 2017 – Bruce Forsyth, English television presenter and entertainer (born 1928)
- 2017 – Zoe Laskari, Greek actress and beauty pageant winner (born 1944)
- 2018 – Denis Edozie, Nigerian Supreme Court judge (born 1935)
- 2018 – Kofi Annan, Ghanaian diplomat and seventh Secretary-General of the United Nations (born 1938)
- 2020 – Ben Cross, English stage and film actor (born 1947)
- 2023 – Lolita, the second-oldest orca in captivity (born ca. 1966)
- 2023 – Al Quie, American politician, 35th Governor of Minnesota (born 1923)
- 2024 – Ruth Johnson Colvin, American author and educator, founded ProLiteracy Worldwide (born 1916)
- 2024 – Alain Delon, French-Swiss actor (born 1935)
- 2024 – Phil Donahue, American talk show host and producer (born 1935)
- 2026 – Bill Rasmussen, American sports director, co-founded ESPN (born 1932)

== Holidays and observances ==
- Christian feast day:
  - Agapitus of Palestrina
  - Alberto Hurtado
  - Daig of Inniskeen
  - Evan (or Inan)
  - Fiacre
  - Florus and Laurus
  - Helena of Constantinople (Roman Catholic Church)
  - August 18 (Eastern Orthodox liturgics)
- Arbor Day (Pakistan)
- Armed Forces Day (North Macedonia)
- Birthday of Virginia Dare (Roanoke Island)
- Constitution Day (Indonesia)
- Long Tan Day, also called Vietnam Veterans' Day (Australia)
- National Science Day (Thailand)

== Sources ==
- Kazemzadeh, Firuz (1991). "Iranian relations with Russia and the Soviet Union, to 1921". In Avery, Peter; Hambly, Gavin; Melville, Charles (eds.). The Cambridge History of Iran. Vol. 7. Cambridge University Press. ISBN 978-0-521-20095-0.
- Mikaberidze, Alexander, ed. (2011). "Russo-Iranian Wars". Conflict and Conquest in the Islamic World: A Historical Encyclopedia, Volume 1. ABC-CLIO. ISBN 978-1-59884-336-1.
