= Al-Mustanjid =

Abbasid Caliph in Baghdad (r. 1160–1170)

al-Mustanjid المستنجد بالله
- Khalīfah; Amir al-Mu'minin
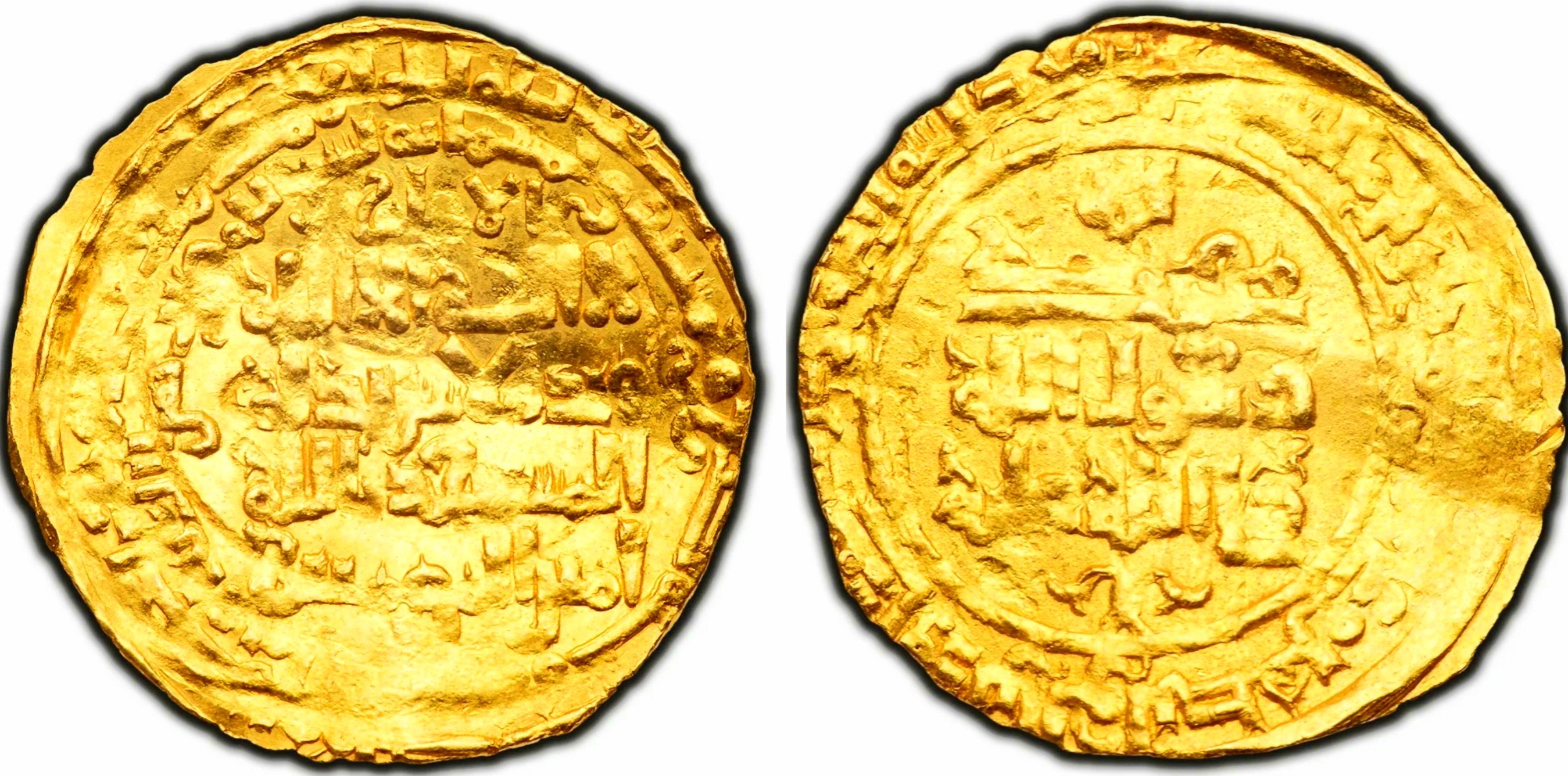
- Gold dinar of al-Mustanjid 557 AH

32nd Caliph of the Abbasid Caliphate Abbasid Caliph in Baghdad
- Reign: 12 March 1160 – 18 December 1170
- Predecessor: al-Muqtafi
- Successor: al-Mustadi
- Born: 1124; Baghdad, Abbasid Caliphate
- Died: 18 December 1170 (aged 46); Baghdad, Abbasid Caliphate
- Burial: Baghdad
- Consort: Zubaydah bint Abu Nasr bin Al-Mustazhir; Ghaddha
- Issue: al-Mustadi
Names
- Abu al-Muzaffar Yusuf ibn Muhammad al-Muqtafi al-Mustanjid bi-llah
- Dynasty: Abbasid
- Father: al-Muqtafi
- Mother: Thawus
- Religion: Sunni Islam

Abu al-Muẓaffar Yusuf ibn Muhammad al-Muqtafi (Arabic: أبو المظفّر يوسف بن محمد المقتفي; 1124 – 20 December 1170) better known by his regnal name al-Mustanjid bi-llah (Arabic: المستنجد بالله) was the Abbasid caliph in Baghdad from 1160 to 1170. He was the son of previous Caliph al-Muqtafi.

== Biography ==
=== Reign ===
Al-Mustanjid was born in 1124. He was the son of caliph al-Muqtafi and his mother was an Umm walad named Thawus al-Rumi. His full name was Yusuf ibn Muhammad al-Muqtafi and his Kunya was Abu al-Muzaffar. When Yusuf was a young prince his father became Caliph in 1136. His father ruled for almost twenty-four years until his death in 1160. When his father died, he ascended to the throne.

During his early reign, one of al-Muqtafi's wives, al-Mustanjid's stepmother, Umm Abu Ali. She was the mother of his son Abu Ali ibn al-Muqtafi. She wanted her own son to succeed and after her husband's death in 1160, She gained over many amirs to her side, and had their slave-girls armed with daggers to kill the new caliph. Al-Mustanjid discovered the plot and placed the rebel son and mother in prison.

He continued the policies of his father and he also confirmed Awn al-Din ibn Hubayra as his vizier. Awn al-Din had previously served as the vizier to his father. Awn al-Din's Tenure marked the final decline of the Seljuq influence in the Abbasid court (cf. Abbasid–Seljuk war), and saw a flowering of Hanbali learning in Baghdad. Ibn Hubayra was also involved in the conquest of Fatimid Egypt by Nur ad-Din Zangi.

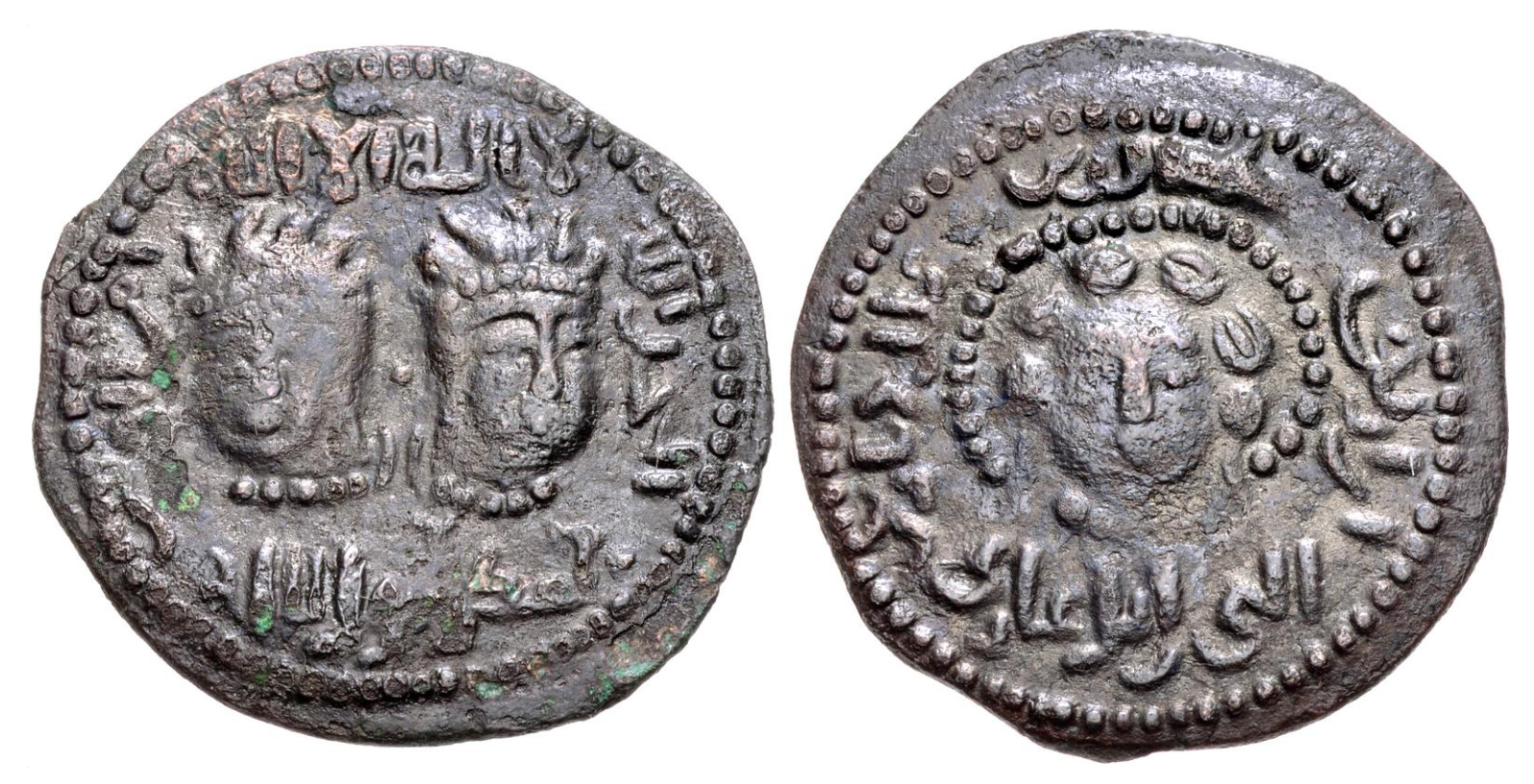
Dirham of artuqid Najm al-Din Alpi, maybe minted in Mardin, with al-Mustanjid's name

During his reign, Al-Mustanjid called upon Ibn al-Jawzi to preach his sermons in the Caliph's palace mosque – one of the most prominent houses of worship in the whole of Baghdad – during the three campaigns of Nur al-Din Zengi against the tottering Fatimid regime. In these sermons, Ibn al-Jawzi is said to have "vigorously defended the prophetic precedent and criticized, not only all those whom he considered to be schismatics, but also the jurists who were too blindly attached to their own schools of law."

There is little else to say than that this caliph continued to occupy a more or less independent position, with a vizier and courtly surroundings, and supported by only a small force sufficient for an occasional local campaign.

=== Revival of Abbasid influence in Egypt ===
During Al-Mustanjid's reign the Caliphate saw a revival of Abbasid influence over Egypt, which was under rival Fatimids. General Shirkuh died from choking on his meal on 23 March 1169. His unexpected departure left a power vacuum, both in the Fatimid government as well as the Syrian expeditionary force. The Fatimid elites conferred in the caliphal palace. Some proposed that Saladin be appointed to the vizierate, while others, led by the eunuch majordomo Mu'tamin al-Khilafa Jawhar, suggested that the Syrians should be given military fiefs (iqta') in the Nile Delta, thus removing them from Cairo, and that no vizier should be appointed, with al-Adid resuming personal rule like his predecessors at the beginning of the dynasty. The Syrian commanders also vied among themselves for the leadership, until Saladin emerged as the favoured candidate. Then, on 26 March 1169, Saladin was received at the caliphal palace and appointed to the vizierate, with the title of al-Malik al-Nasir (lit. 'the King who Brings Victory'). The fiction that Saladin was al-Adid's servant was upheld, but the real balance of power is shown by the fact that in the document of investiture, for the first time, the vizierate was declared as hereditary.

Nevertheless, Saladin's position was far from secure. His forces numbered a few thousand and, even though superior in combat ability, were massively outnumbered by the Fatimid troops. Furthermore, Saladin could not fully rely on the loyalty of his own commanders. Saladin's role in the Fatimid state was also a source of contradictions: he was a Sunni, who had come into Egypt with a Sunni army, and who still owed allegiance to Nur al-Din's militantly Sunni regime; but as vizier of the Fatimid caliph, he was in charge of a nominally Isma'ili state, and even of the Isma'ili religious establishment (da'wa). The Fatimid elites in the court and the army were bound to oppose Saladin's attempts to dismantle the Egyptian regime, while Nur al-Din was distrustful of his erstwhile subordinate's intentions. This obliged Saladin to tread carefully at first, making a serious effort to establish good relations with al-Adid and promote a public image of harmony between the two. After additional Syrian troops arrived under the command of Saladin's older brother, Shams ad-Din Turanshah, Saladin gradually distanced himself from the Fatimid regime, starting by introducing Nur al-Din's name in the Friday sermon after that of al-Adid. Al-Adid was relegated to a ceremonial role, and even publicly humiliated when Saladin entered the palace on horseback (hitherto a privilege of the caliphs). Saladin also began openly favouring his Syrian troops, awarding them military fiefs for their upkeep, while withdrawing similar fiefs from the Fatimid commanders. Lev points out that a considerable part of the Fatimid civilian bureaucracy, many of them by now Sunnis, had become alienated from the regime they served. Many of them—most notably the chancery official Qadi al-Fadil—chose to collaborate with Saladin and effectively helped him undermine the Fatimid regime.

The pro-Fatimid opposition against the ascendancy of Saladin and his Syrians coalesced around Mu'tamin al-Khilafa Jawhar. The conspirators reportedly did not hesitate to contact the Crusaders for help, in the hopes that a new Crusader invasion would draw Saladin away from Cairo, allowing them to seize control of the capital. When a letter to this effect fell into his hands, Saladin seized the opportunity to quickly and ruthlessly purge Cairo of his rivals, and Mu'tamin al-Khalifa was assassinated. Thereupon, on 21 August 1169, the Black African troops rose in revolt. In street fighting that lasted for two days, Saladin defeated them and ousted them from the city. They were pursued and defeated by Turan-Shah, while their quarters in the suburb of al-Mansuriyya were burnt. In the aftermath, Saladin appointed his confidante, Baha al-Din Qaraqush, as majordomo of the caliphal palaces, thus securing control of the Fatimid caliph and his court.

Deprived of any loyal troops and closely watched over in his own palace by Qaraqush, al-Adid was now completely at Saladin's mercy. When a joint Byzantine–Crusader attack was launched on Damietta in October–December 1169, al-Adid handed over a million dinars to finance the expedition sent against the invaders. The historian Michael Brett sees in this a measure of accommodation by the caliph to the new situation, but Lev speaks of blatant "extortion" of al-Adid by Saladin, pointing out that the Fatimid caliph was effectively under house arrest, and that his contribution of such an enormous sum only served to weaken his position. When Saladin's father, Ayyub, arrived in Cairo in March 1170, the Fatimid caliph in person rode out with Saladin to meet him—an unheard-of honour—and awarded him the title al-Malik al-Awhad (lit. 'the Singular King').

With his position secure, Saladin solidified control of the administrative machinery of Egypt by appointing Syrians instead of native Egyptians to all public posts. As part of this, his immediate family were appointed to the most important provincial governorships. At the same time, Saladin began a slow but inexorable assault on the ideological foundations of the Fatimid state. On 25 August 1170, the call to prayer was changed from the Shi'a formula back to the Sunni one, and the first three Rashidun caliphs included, a practice offensive to Shi'a doctrine. Even al-Adid's name was subtly excluded from it by replacing it with a formula that sought God's blessings for "He who Strengthens God's Faith"—which, as the historian Heinz Halm remarks, could refer to al-Adid's regnal name, but also to "any pious Muslim, even the (Abbasid) Sunni caliph of Baghdad". In mid-1170, al-Adid was forbidden from attending the Friday and festival prayers in state. In September 1170, Sunni madrasas were established in the old capital of Fustat; and all juridical posts were filled with Shafi'i Sunnis, mostly Syrians or Kurds. In February 1171, even the chief qadi was replaced by a Sunni appointee, followed by the final suspension of the public lectures of the Isma'ili doctrine at the al-Azhar Mosque. The Sunni jurists even issued a legal decision which allowed Saladin to legally execute al-Adid as a heretic. Shortly after Al-Mustanjid's death, the Fatimid dynasty was completely abolished and Egypt came directly under Ayyubid–Abbasid control.

== See also ==
- Ar-Rashid bi-llāh, 30th Abbasid Caliph and Cousin of Al-Mustanjid
- Safiyya al-Baghdadiyya, 12th century Arabic poet

== Sources ==
- Makdisi, G. (1971). "Ibn Hubayra". In Lewis, B.; Ménage, V. L.; Pellat, Ch. & Schacht, J. (eds.). The Encyclopaedia of Islam, Second Edition. Volume III: H–Iram. Leiden: E. J. Brill. pp. 802–803. OCLC 495469525.
- Richards, D.S. (2010). The Chronicle of Ibn Al-Athir for the Crusading Period from Al-Kamil Fi'L-Ta'Rikh.: The Years 491-541/1097-1146 the Coming of the Franks and the Muslim Response. Crusade texts in translation. Ashgate. ISBN 978-0-7546-6950-0.
- This text is adapted from William Muir's public domain, The Caliphate: Its Rise, Decline, and Fall.
- Daftary, Farhad (2007). The Ismāʿı̄lı̄s: Their History and Doctrines (Second ed.). Cambridge: Cambridge University Press. ISBN 978-0-521-61636-2.
- Ehrenkreutz, Andrew S. (1972). Saladin. Albany: State University of New York Press. ISBN 0-87395-095-X.
- Halm, Heinz (2014). Kalifen und Assassinen: Ägypten und der vordere Orient zur Zeit der ersten Kreuzzüge, 1074–1171 [Caliphs and Assassins: Egypt and the Near East at the Time of the First Crusades, 1074–1171] (in German). Munich: C. H. Beck. doi:10.17104/9783406661648-1. ISBN 978-3-406-66163-1.
- Lev, Yaacov (1999). Saladin in Egypt. Leiden, Boston, Köln: Brill. ISBN 90-04-11221-9.
- Sajjadi, Sadeq; Daftary, Farhad; Umar, Suheyl (2008). "Al-ʿĀḍid". In Madelung, Wilferd; Daftary, Farhad (eds.). Encyclopaedia Islamica, Volume 3 (Adab – al-Bāb al-Ḥādī ͑ashar). Leiden & Boston: Brill. pp. 69–73. ISBN 978-90-04-16860-2.
- Saleh, Marlis J. (2009). "al-ʿĀḍid li-Dīn Allāh". In Fleet, Kate; Krämer, Gudrun; Matringe, Denis; Nawas, John; Rowson, Everett (eds.). Encyclopaedia of Islam (3rd ed.). Brill Online. doi:10.1163/1573-3912_ei3_COM_22734. ISSN 1873-9830.
- Şeşen, Ramazan (1988). "Âdıd-Lidînillâh". TDV Encyclopedia of Islam, Vol. 1 (Âb-ı Hayat – El-ahkâmü'ş-şer'i̇yye) (in Turkish). Istanbul: Presidency of Religious Affairs, Centre for Islamic Studies. pp. 374–375. ISBN 978-975-954-801-8.
- Brett, Michael (2017). The Fatimid Empire. The Edinburgh History of the Islamic Empires. Edinburgh: Edinburgh University Press. ISBN 978-0-7486-4076-8.

Al-Mustanjid Abbasid dynasty Born: 1124 Died: 20 December 1170
Sunni Islam titles
Preceded by Al-Muqtafi	Caliph of Islam; Abbasid Caliph; 12 March 1160 – 20 December 1170	Succeeded by Al-Mustadi
