= Fatima Khatun (disambiguation) =

Fatima Khatun may refer to:

- Fatima Khatun, advisor and intimate of Töregene Khatun
- Fatimah Khatun, Seljuk princess and principal wife of Abbasid caliph al-Muqtafi
- Fatima Khatun, eldest daughter of Hümaşah Sultan
