= Tahirid Palace =

The Tahirid Palace (Dār Ibn Ṭāhir) or Tahirid Precinct/Sanctuary (al-Ḥarīm al-Ṭāhirī) was an Abbasid-era palace in Baghdad

The palace was constructed on the western bank of the Tigris River, at the so-called Zubaidiyya Fief, by Muhammad ibn Abdallah ibn Tahir, a member of the Tahirid dynasty, which during the 9th century ruled Khurasan as semi-independent clients of the Abbasids, and held the post of governor of Baghdad. The palace functioned as the seat of the Tahirid governors, and had the right of sanctuary (ḥarīm), meaning that anyone could seek refuge on its grounds.

Following the return of the Abbasid caliphs to Baghdad in the late 9th century, the palace became a secondary caliphal palace, used chiefly as a residence for the caliphs' sons, or as a state prison for deposed caliphs al-Qahir and al-Muttaqi. Caliphs al-Mu'tadid and al-Muktafi, and possibly also al-Muqtadir, were buried in its grounds, along with numerous Abbasid princes.

In the later 10th century, parts of the palace were purchased by the Buyid ruler Izz al-Dawla, and served as his residence and that of the later Buyid governors of the city. During the 1136 Siege of Baghdad by the Seljuks, the palace was plundered by the populace, and what remained of it was nearly entirely destroyed in the great Tigris floods of 1217.

== Sources ==
- Busse, Heribert (2004) [1969]. Chalif und Grosskönig - Die Buyiden im Irak (945-1055) [Caliph and Great King - The Buyids in Iraq (945-1055)] (in German). Würzburg: Ergon Verlag. ISBN 3-89913-005-7.
- Le Strange, Guy (1922). Baghdad During the Abbasid Caliphate. From Contemporary Arabic and Persian Sources (Second ed.). Oxford: Clarendon Press.
