= Al-Rashid Mausoleum =

Twelver Shi'ite mausoleum in Isfahan, Iran

- آرامگاه الراشدبالله
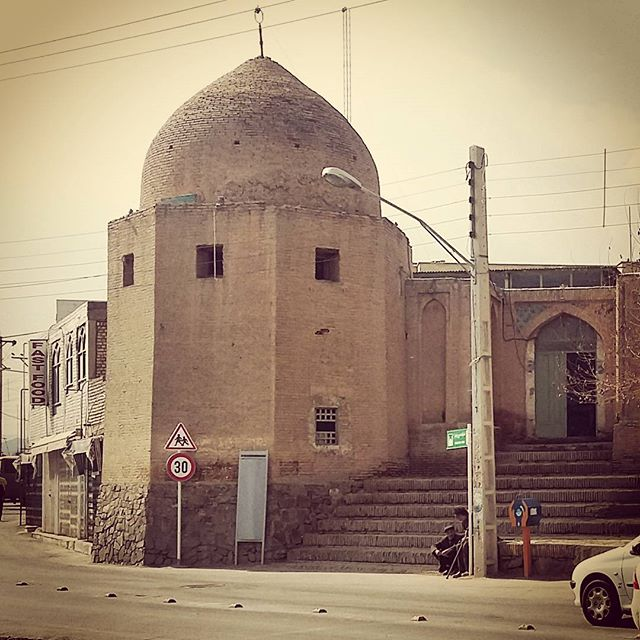

- Location of the complex in Iran

Religion
- Affiliation: Shia (Twelver)
- Ecclesiastical or organizational status: Mausoleum
- Status: Active

Location
- Location: Esfahan, Isfahan Province
- Country: Iran
- Interactive map of Al-Rashid Mausoleum
- Coordinates: 32°37′47″N 51°43′05″E

Architecture
- Type: Islamic architecture
- Style: Seljuk
- Completed: 1138 CE

Specifications
- Dome: One
- Minaret: One (since destroyed)
- Shrine: Two (maybe more)
- Materials: Stone; bricks; plaster

Iran National Heritage List
- Official name: Al-Rashid Mausoleum
- Type: Built
- Designated: 31 May 2003
- Reference no.: 9096
- Conservation organization: Cultural Heritage, Handicrafts and Tourism Organization of Iran

The Al-Rashid Mausoleum (Persian: آرامگاه الراشد بالله; Arabic: ضريح الراشد بالله), also known as the Imamzadeh Husayn (Persian: امامزاده حسین) and as the Al-Rashid Billah Mausoleum, is a Twelver Shi'ite mausoleum, located in Esfahan, in the province of Isfahan, Iran. The complex was completed during the Seljuk era, and is located on the northern bank of Zayanderud beside the Shahrestan bridge.

The complex was added to the Iran National Heritage List on 31 May 2003, administered by the Cultural Heritage, Handicrafts and Tourism Organization of Iran.

== History ==
This structure was originally a 12th-century mosque, which was built on the ruins of a Zoroastrian fire temple which was destroyed during the Rashidun conquest of Iran in the 7th century. It was also said that the mosque was built over a temple for Mithraism. The Abbasid caliph of Baghdad, Al-Rashid Billah, fled to Isfahan after having conflict with the Seljuk Sultan Mahmud II, but was subsequently assassinated and buried in the northern corner of the mosque, which was developed into his tomb. However, the mosque and its minaret were demolished several centuries later, and only the structure of the tomb remained with its single dome.

At some point of time, a personality named Husayn ibn Zayd al-Hasani was buried in the mausoleum, and it was given the name Imamzadeh Husayn due to this. A wooden zarih was built around the grave of Husayn. Later, another person named Shah Ibrahim was buried in the building.

== Gallery ==
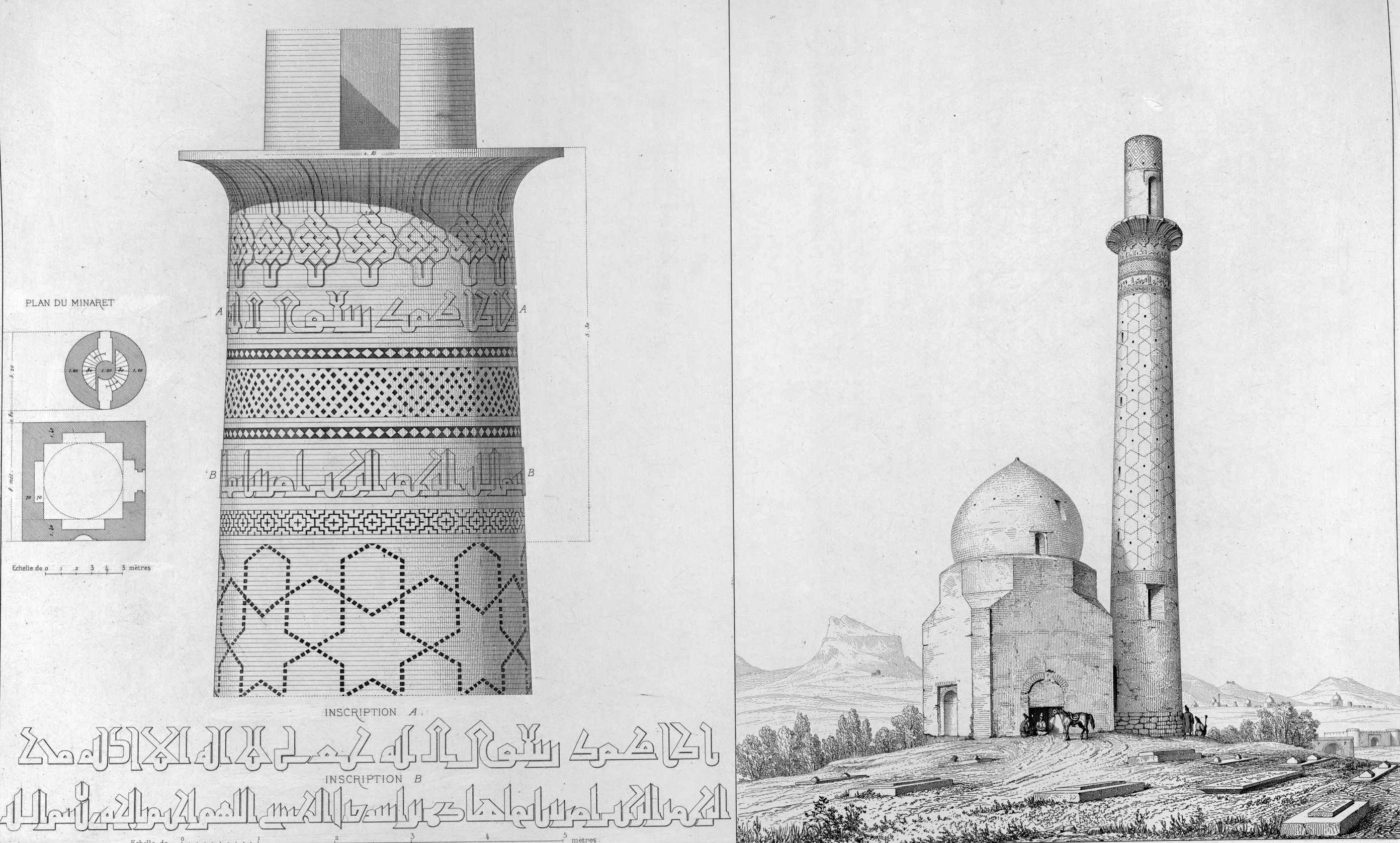
Detail of the minaret, by Pascal Coste

== See also ==
- List of the historical structures in the Isfahan province
- List of mausoleums in Iran
- Shia Islam in Iran
