= Awn al-Din ibn Hubayra =

12th-century Iraqi Arab official and Hanbali jurist

Abbasid Vizier
- In office 1149–1165
- Monarchs: Al-Muqtafi, Al-Mustanjid

Personal details
- Born: 1105/06 Dur village, Baghdad, Abbasid Caliphate
- Died: 27 March 1165 Baghdad, Abbasid Caliphate
- Known for: Hanbali school of jurisprudence, Author of a multi-volume commentary on Sahih al-Bukhari and Sahih Muslim, Author of al-Muqtasad

Awn al-Din ibn Hubayra
- عون الدين بن هبيرة

Religious life
- Religion: Islam
- Denomination: Sunni
- Jurisprudence: Hanbali
- Creed: Athari

Awn al-Din Abu'l-Muzzafar Yahya ibn Hubayra al-Shaybani al-Duri al-Baghdadi (Arabic: أبو المظفر عون الدين يحيي بن هبيرة الشيباني; 1105-1165), commonly referred to as Ibn Hubayra, was a 12th-century Iraqi Arab official and a Hanbali jurist, who served for sixteen years as vizier of the Abbasid Caliphate under Caliph al-Muqtafi, and his successor al-Mustanjid.

== Biography ==
Ibn Hubayra was born on Rabi II 499 A.H. (December 1105 / January 1106 CE) in Dur, a village northwest of Baghdad.He was known as “ The accomplished Vizier—The Imam, the learned scholar, and the just ruler, al-Shaybani, al-Duri, al-Iraqi, al-Hanbali , the author of the works”. As a youth, he went to Baghdad where he received a classical Arabic education under several masters, studying the Qur'an, Arabic linguistics, and the Hanbali school of Islamic jurisprudence (fiqh). He was appointed as the chief of the treasury by caliph al-Muqtafi, and in 1149, he was appointed as the vizier (chief minister) of the Caliphate, a post he kept for sixteen years until his death on 27 March 1165, commonly attributed to poisoning through his physician, who was in the pay of his rivals.

His vizierate marked the final decline of the Seljuq influence in the Abbasid court (cf. Siege of Baghdad (1157)), and saw a flowering of Hanbali learning in Baghdad. Ibn Hubayra was also involved in the conquest of Fatimid Egypt by Nur ad-Din Zangi.

== Works ==
Ibn Hubayra was also an accomplished scholar. He published a multi-volume commentary on the Sahih al-Bukhari and the Sahih Muslim collections of hadith, entitled al-Ifṣāḥ ‘an ma‘ānĩ'l Ṣiḥāḥ or al-Ishrāf. He also wrote a grammar called al-Muqtaṣaḍ, an abridgment of Ibn al-Sikkit's Iṣlāḥ al-manṭiq, the al-‘Ibādāt al-khams, the Urjūza fi‘l-maqsūr wa‘l-mamdūd, and Urjūza fi ‘ilm al-khaṭṭ. A collection of his sayings was compiled by his contemporary Abu'l-Faraj ibn al-Jawzi (al-Muqtabas min al-fawā‘id al-‘Awniyya), who also published an anthology from the al-Ifṣāḥ. Ibn al-Jawzi's works are the main source on Ibn Hubayra's life, along with a biography by the Hanbali scholar Ibn al-Maristaniyya

== Sources ==
- Makdisi, G. (1971). "Ibn Hubayra". In Lewis, B.; Ménage, V. L.; Pellat, Ch. & Schacht, J. (eds.). The Encyclopaedia of Islam, Second Edition. Volume III: H–Iram. Leiden: E. J. Brill. pp. 802–803. OCLC 495469525.
