= Dawud (Seljuk sultan) =

Seljuk Sultan r. 1131–1136

Sultan of Seljuk Empire
- Reign: 11 September 1131 – 1132
- Predecessor: Mahmud II
- Successor: Tughril II
- Co-sultan: Ahmad Sanjar (1131–1132)

Seljuk Crown Prince
- Tenure: 1142-1143
- Monarch: Ghiyath ad-Din Mas'ud

Governor of South Azerbaijan
- Tenure: 1136-1143
- Monarch: Ghiyath ad-Din Mas'ud
- Born: 1115 or 1117
- Died: 1142/43 (aged 28 or 26 ) Tabriz
- Spouse: Gawhar Khatun
Names
- Mughith al-Dunya wa'l-Din Abu'l-Fath Dawud bin Mahmud
- House: Seljuk dynasty
- Father: Mahmud II
- Mother: Mah-i Mulk Khatun
- Religion: Sunni Islam

Mughith al-Dunya wa'l-Din Abu'l-Fath Dawud bin Mahmud (Arabic: مغیث الدنيا والدين أبو الفتح داود بن محمود); died 1142/43) was a Seljuk Sultan who ruled Baghdad and for a short period of Iranian Azerbaijan (1131–1132) in confrontation with his uncles Masud and Tughrul II.

After his father's death in 1131, Dawud was installed as the new sultan. However, his uncles Masud and Tughrul II opposed this, and at the same time they conspired against Ahmad Sanjar, and in light of the rejection of Dawud's authority, the Caliph Al-Mustarshid accepted his authority. But eventually in 1132, Dawud was overthrown and replaced by his uncle Tughrul II.

== Life ==
Dawud tried to recapture Hamadan, but was defeated and retreated with Atabeg Ak Sunqur al-Ahmadili to Azerbaijan. Here he entered into an alliance with his uncle Masud. Dawud moved to Baghdad, where he found support from the Caliph. In 1133, Dawud marched with an army from Baghdad against Hamadan. At this time, Masud had already started a war with Tughrul II. So Dawud declared himself an authority again. However, Masud returned to confront him, defeated him, and became the new sultan, so Dawud fled to Baghdad until he recognized Masud's authority. He tried to incite the Caliph Al-Mustarshid to revolt. But they were defeated and captured. Dawud was able to escape and hide in northern Iraq.

In 1136 he moved to Baghdad, where the new Caliph Al-Rashid incited a revolt against Sultan Masud. Dawud was once again installed as the new Sultan of Iraq. Imad al-Din Zengi, the atabeg of Mosul and Aleppo, and Dabis Ibn Sadaqa from the Mazyad clan, the Emir of Basra, stood with him. However, the allies were defeated by the forces of Sultan Masud, and Dawud was defeated at the Battle of Mirage. After that, Dawud fled to Tabriz, where he became governor of South Azerbaijan.

== Death ==
For the remaining six years of his life, Dawud ruled Azerbaijan and in effect gave up fighting for the sultanate. He also reconciled with Masud, whom he officially recognized as heir to the throne (Crown Prince). In 1143/1144, but he was killed by the Nizaris in the year 1143 in Tabriz, and those who killed him survived, so he did not hear about them, because if they hadn't survived, he would have heard of them, even thought he was killed.

== See also ==
- Seljuk dynasty

== Sources ==
- al-Athīr, I.D.I.; Richards, D.S. (2006). The Chronicle of Ibn Al-Athīr for the Crusading Period from Al-Kāmil Fīʼl-taʼrīkh: The years 541-589. Crusade texts in translation. Ashgate. ISBN 978-0-7546-4078-3.
- Bosworth, E. (2000). The History of the Seljuq Turks: The Saljuq-nama of Zahir al-Din Nishpuri. Taylor & Francis. ISBN 978-1-136-75257-5.
