= Al-Muqtafi =

Abbasid Caliph in Baghdad (r. 1136–1160)

Al-Muqtafi المقتفي لأمر الله
- Khalīfah Amir al-Mu'minin

31st Caliph of the Abbasid Caliphate; Abbasid Caliph in Baghdad
- Reign: 17 September 1136 – 12 March 1160
- Predecessor: Al-Rashid
- Successor: Al-Mustanjid
- Born: 9 April 1096; Baghdad, Abbasid Caliphate
- Died: 12 March 1160 (aged 63); Baghdad, Abbasid Caliphate
- Burial: Baghdad
- Consort: Fatimah Khatun; Thawus; Umm Abu Ali
- Issue: Al-Mustanjid; Abu Ali; Zubaydah; Kerman
Names
- ʾAbu ʿAbdallāh Muḥammad ibn ʾAḥmad al-Mustaẓhir al-Muqtafī li-ʾAmri ʾillāh
- Dynasty: Abbasid
- Father: Al-Mustazhir
- Mother: Ashin
- Religion: Sunni Islam

Abu Abdallah Muhammad ibn Ahmad al-Mustazhir (Arabic: أبو عبد الله محمد بن أحمد المستظهر; 9 April 1096 – 12 March 1160), better known by his regnal name al-Muqtafi li-Amr Allah (المقتفي لأمر الله), was the Abbasid caliph in Baghdad from 1136 to 1160, succeeding his nephew al-Rashid, who had been forced to abdicate by the Seljuks. The continued disunion and contests between Seljuks afforded al-Muqtafi opportunity of not only maintaining his authority in Baghdad, but also extending it throughout Iraq.

== Birth and background ==
The future caliph al-Muqtafi was born on 9 April 1096 as Abu Abdallah Muhammad, the son of the caliph al-Mustazhir (r. 1094–1118). His mother was Ashin, a slave girl from Syria. After his father's death his half-brother al-Mustarshid succeeded him on 6 August 1118. Al-Mustarshid (r. 1118–1135) ruled for sixteen years as Caliph but the last three years of his reign were occupied with war against Seljuq sultan Mas'ud (his deputy). Not long after the siege of Damascus, al-Mustarshid launched a military campaign against Seljuk sultan Mas'ud, who had obtained the title in Baghdad in January 1133 by the caliph himself. The rival armies met near Hamadan. The caliph, deserted by his troops, was taken prisoner, and pardoned on the promising not to quit his palace. Left in the caliphal tent, however, in the sultan's absence, he was found murdered while reading the Quran, as is supposed, by an emissary of the Assassins, who had no love for the caliph. Modern historians have suspected that Mas'ud instigated the murder although the two most important historians of the period Ibn al-Athir and Ibn al-Jawzi did not speculate on this matter. Physically, al-Mustarshid was a red-haired man with blue eyes and freckles.

Al-Mustarshid was succeeded by his son and heir apparent, Al-Rashid Billah on 29 August 1135. Like his father al-Mustarshid, al-Rashid Billah made another attempt of military independence (forming his own military) from the Seljuks. To avenge his father's death, he insulted the envoy of sultan Ghiyath ad-Din Mas'ud who came to demand a heavy largess, incited the mob to plunder his palace, and then, supported by Zengi, who was equally hostile to the sultan because of the murder of Dubais ibn Sadaqah, set up a rival sultan. Mas'ud hastened to the rebellious capital and laid siege to it. Baghdad, well defended by the river and its canals, resisted the attack; but in the end the caliph and Zengi, hopeless of success, escaped to Mosul. The sultan's power restored, a council was held, the caliph deposed, and his uncle al-Muqtafi succeeded as the new caliph. Al-Rashid Bi'llah fled to Isfahan where he was assassinated by a team of four Nizari Ismailis (Assassins) in June 1138. This was celebrated in Alamut for a week.

== Reign ==
Al-Muqtafi was proclaimed caliph on 17 September 1136. He was able to use the infighting of the Seljuks to safeguard his own control over Baghdad, and even gradually extend his rule over much of Iraq.

In 1148, he successfully fought off a group of Seljuk generals who rebelled against Sultan Mas'ud and marched on Baghdad. According to some sources, a similar attempt followed in the next year, and was likewise defeated by the caliph's troops. Following the death of Mas'ud in October 1152, and the ensuing contest for the sultanate among the Seljuks, al-Muqtafi played an active role. In the months after Mas'ud's death, he seized Wasit and al-Hilla. In the Seljuk succession struggle, he supported Mas'ud's brother, Suleiman-Shah, against Mas'ud's nephew, Muhammad II, extracting from the former a pledge not to interfere in Iraq.

Also in 1148, the Second Crusade arrived in Syria, led by Louis VII of France and Conrad III of Germany. Nur ad-Din's victories and the Crusaders' losses in Asia Minor however had made the recovery of Edessa – their original goal – practically impossible. Given that Aleppo was too far off from Jerusalem for an attack and Damascus, recently allied with the Kingdom of Jerusalem against Zengi, had entered into an alliance with Nur ad-Din, the Crusaders decided to attack Damascus, the conquest of which would preclude a combination of Jerusalem's enemies. Mu'in ad-Din threatened to turn the city over to Nur ad-Din if he was unable to defend it, but the crusader siege collapsed after only four days. Nur ad-Din took advantage of the failure of the Crusade to prepare another attack against Antioch. In 1149, he launched an offensive against the territories dominated by the castle of Harim, situated on the eastern bank of the Orontes River, after which he besieged the castle of Inab. The Prince of Antioch, Raymond of Poitiers, quickly came to the aid of the besieged citadel. The Muslim army destroyed the Crusader army at the Battle of Inab, during which Raymond was killed, moreover, Raymond's head was sent to Nur ad-Din, who sent it along to the caliph al-Muqtafi in Baghdad.

Al-Muqtafi noticed weakness of the Isma'ili Fatimid regime, In 1154, caliph al-Muqtafi issued a diploma appointing the Zengid emir of Syria, Nur al-Din (r. 1146–1174), as the nominal ruler of Egypt.

After Muhammad defeated Suleiman-Shah, however, the Seljuks marched on Baghdad and forced the caliph to take refuge in the eastern quarter, initiating the Seljuk siege of Baghdad of 1157. The siege was eventually abandoned as Muhammad faced the rebellion of Malik-Shah III in Hamadan, and over time al-Muqtafi restored good relations with Muhammad. During his last years, al-Muqtafi attacked Tikrit twice in vain, but captured the town of Lihf.

Awn al-Din ibn Hubayra was appointed as the vizier of the Caliph, a post he kept for sixteen years until his death on 27 March 1165, commonly attributed to poisoning through his physician, who was in the pay of his rivals.

During his caliphate, the Crusades were raging and Zengi, the vassal of the Abbasids, ruler of Mosul and founder of Zengid dynasty, obtained high distinction as a brave and generous warrior. At one time hard pressed, Zengi made urgent appeal for help to Baghdad. The sultan and the caliph dispatched 20,000 men in response.

Al-Muqtafi is praised by contemporary Muslim historians as virtuous, capable and brave. During his caliphate of twenty-five years, he conducted many minor expeditions against enemies throughout Iraq and Syria.

== Religious policy ==
Al-Muqtafi maintain good relations with Muslim scholars. He even appointed a jurist and Hadith scholar as his vizer. Also Ibn al-Jawzi began his career proper during the reign of al-Muqtafi, his Hanbali vizier, Ibn Hubayra served as a patron of Ibn al-Jawzi's scholarship. Beginning his scholarly career as a teaching assistant to his mentor Abū Ḥakīm al-Nahrawānī, who taught Hanbali jurisprudence in two separate schools, Ibn al-Jawzi succeeded al-Nahrawānī as "master of these two colleges" after the latter's death in 1161.

Al-Muqtafi had tolerant and good relations with Christian communities. Bar Hebraeus gave an account of Abdisho's patriarchate and Al-Muqtafi's behaviour after his patriarchal election: He writes "Bar Sawma was succeeded by ʾAbdishoʾ Bar Moqli, of Mosul, an old man of a fine appearance. He was summoned to the caliph's palace after the election, and after he was crowned with the mitre and seated upon a mule, he progressed as far as the church of the third ward with one of the noblemen of the palace, and there dismounted. He conducted his patriarchate ably for nine years, and was then struck down by an apoplexy. He was consecrated on a Sunday, the tenth day of the latter teshrin [November] in the year 533 of the Arabs [AD 1139], and died on the third day of the latter teshrin in the year 541 of the same era [AD 1147]".

A charter of protection granted by al-Muqtafi in 1139 to the Nestorian patriarch Abdisho III was published in 1926 by the Assyrian scholar Alphonse Mingana.

== Family ==
One of his wives was Fatimah Khatun, the daughter of Sultan Muhammad I Tapar and his wife Nistandar Jahan. They married in 1137. She died in September 1147. One of his concubines was Thawus, a Greek. She was the mother of Al-Mustanjid, who became his successor. Another concubine was Umm Abu Ali. She was the mother of his son Abu Ali. She wanted her own son to succeed and after her husband's death in 1160, She gained over many amirs to her side, and had their slave-girls armed with daggers to kill the new caliph. Al-Mustanjid discovered the plot and placed the rebel son and mother in prison.

One of his daughters was Zubaydah. She was the wife of sultan Ghiyath ad-Din Mas'ud. They married in 1140. Her dowry was one hundred thousand dinars. The wedding procession was delayed for five years because of her young age. However, the marriage was never consummated because of Masud's ultimate death in 1152. Another daughter was Kerman Khatun. She was wife of sultan Muhammad II. They married towards the end of 1158 or in early 1159. He was, however, unable to consummate the marriage owing to his illness. After his death, she married Arslan-Shah in November 1160.

== Death ==
Al-Muqtafi died on 12 March 1160 at the age 64. He was succeeded by his son Yusuf better known by his regnal name al-Mustanjid. He was born in 1124, and assumed the throne at the age of 36 after the death of his father al-Muqtafi.

His son ascended to the throne. He continued the policies of his father and he also confirmed Awn al-Din ibn Hubayra as his vizier. Awn al-Din had previously served as the vizier during his own reign.

== See also ==
- Abu Mansur Mauhub al-Jawaliqi, served as imam for al-Muqtafi.
- Abd al-Latif al-Baghdadi

== Sources ==
- Makdisi, G. (1971). "Ibn Hubayra". In Lewis, B.; Ménage, V. L.; Pellat, Ch. & Schacht, J. (eds.). The Encyclopaedia of Islam, Second Edition. Volume III: H–Iram. Leiden: E. J. Brill. pp. 802–803. OCLC 495469525.
- Tor, D. G. (2017). "The Political Revival of the Abbasid Caliphate: Al-Muqtafī and the Seljuqs". Journal of the American Oriental Society. 137 (2): 301–314. doi:10.7817/jameroriesoci.137.2.0301.
- Zetterstéen, K. V. (1993). "al-Muḳtafī". In Bosworth, C. E.; van Donzel, E.; Heinrichs, W. P. & Pellat, Ch. (eds.). The Encyclopaedia of Islam, Second Edition. Volume VII: Mif–Naz. Leiden: E. J. Brill. pp. 543–544. ISBN 978-90-04-09419-2.
- Richards, D.S. (2010). The Chronicle of Ibn Al-Athir for the Crusading Period from Al-Kamil Fi'L-Ta'Rikh.: The Years 491-541/1097-1146 the Coming of the Franks and the Muslim Response. Crusade texts in translation. Ashgate. ISBN 978-0-7546-6950-0.
- This text is adapted from William Muir's public domain, The Caliphate: Its Rise, Decline, and Fall.
- Tyerman, Christopher (2006). God's War: A New History of the Crusades. Harvard University Press. ISBN 978-0674023871.
- Barber, Malcolm (2012). The Crusader States. Yale University Press. ISBN 978-0300189315.
- Runciman, Steven (1952). "The Kingdom of Jerusalem and the Frankish East, 1100–1187". A History of the Crusades. Vol. 2. Cambridge University Press. OCLC 1035592581.
- Lev, Yaacov (1999). Saladin in Egypt. Leiden, Boston, Köln: Brill. ISBN 90-04-11221-9.

Al-Muqtafi Abbasid dynasty Cadet branch of the Banu Hashim Born: 9 April 1096 Died: 12 March 1160
Sunni Islam titles
Preceded by Al-Rashid	Caliph of Islam; Abbasid Caliph; 17 September 1136 – 12 March 1160	Succeeded by Al-Mustanjid
