= Siege of Baghdad (1136) =

Seljuk siege of the Abbasid capital city

- Part of the Abbasid–Seljuk Conflicts
Date	June 25 – August 14, 1136
Location	Baghdad, Abbasid caliphate (modern day Iraq)
Result	Seljuk victory

Belligerents
Seljuks	Caliphate of Baghdad; Zengids of Mosul

Commanders and leaders
Ghiyath ad-Din Mas'ud	al-Rashid Billah

Strength
Unknown	Unknown

The Siege of Baghdad (Arabic: حِصَارُ بَغْدَاد, romanized: Ḥiṣāru Baghdād) was a fifty-day blockade of Baghdad, the seat of the Abbasid caliphs, in 1136.

== Background ==
After the defeat of caliph al-Mustarshid against the Seljuks in the battle of Hamadan in June 1135, he was forced to pay an undisclosed sum of war reparations, disband his forces and promise to never campaign again. Al-Mustarshid was, however, murdered shortly after and his son and successor, caliph al-Rashid rejected to pay the reparations in October 1135, likely because they were excessive. When the envoys of the Seljuk ruler of Iraq, Ghiyath ad-Din Mas'ud, insisted, al-Rashid had them ejected and was soon joined by commanders opposed to Mas'ud such as Imad al-Din Zengi while the Seljuk palace in Bagdhad was plundered. On 22 November the khutba was changed from invoking the name of Great Sultan Ahmad Sanjar and Sultan Mas'ud’s to the name of Dawud. Though Zengi was able to defeat the advance guard of Mas'ud, he retreated to Mosul upon realising that the caliph's commanders were in negotiations wit the sultan.

== Siege ==
The siege began when the Seljuk ruler of Iraq, Ghiyath ad-Din Mas'ud, attacked the caliph al-Rashid Billah. During the siege, the populace of Baghdad rose in revolt against the caliph, plundering the Tahirid Palace. In the end, al-Rashid fled the city for Mosul on 14 August and Mas'ud entered the city on 15 August. His uncle, al-Muqtafi, was raised to the throne instead by Mas'ud on 18 August, who then retired to the east.

== Sources ==
- Basan, Osman Aziz (2010). The Great Seljuqs: A History. Routledge. ISBN 1136953930.
- Le Strange, Guy (1922). Baghdad During the Abbasid Caliphate. From Contemporary Arabic and Persian Sources (Second ed.). Oxford: Clarendon Press.
