= Safiyya al-Baghdadiyya =

12th-century Arabic poet of Later Abbasid Era

Safiyya صفية
- Born: Baghdad, Abbasid Caliphate (now Iraq)
- Died: Baghdad, Abbasid Caliphate
- Resting place: Baghdad
- Occupation: Arabic Poet
- Writing career
- Pen name: Safiyya al-Baghdadiyya (صفية البغدادية)
- Language: Arabic
- Period: Islamic Golden Age (Later Abbasid era)

Safiyya al-Baghdadiyya (Arabic: صفية البغدادية) was a Medieval Arabic poet writing during the 12th Century CE. This late period of the Abbasids has been called a Golden Age which 'created a liberal, but elite, society keen to enjoy Allah's earthly gifts'.

== Career ==
The diwans (collected poems) of female poets were not as well recorded, and little is known about al-Baghdadiyya's life. Her poem 'I am the wonder' is collected in Abdulla al-Udhari's Classical Poems by Arab Women (1999). Al-Udhari notes in the book that 'Nothing is known about the poet'. The poem demonstrates al-Baghdadiyya's liberal outlook and remarkable self-confidence:

I am the wonder of the world, the ravisher of hearts and minds.
Once you’ve seen my stunning looks, you’re a fallen man.
