= Leeward Point Field =

Leeward Point Field Leeward Airfield Naval Station Guantanamo Bay
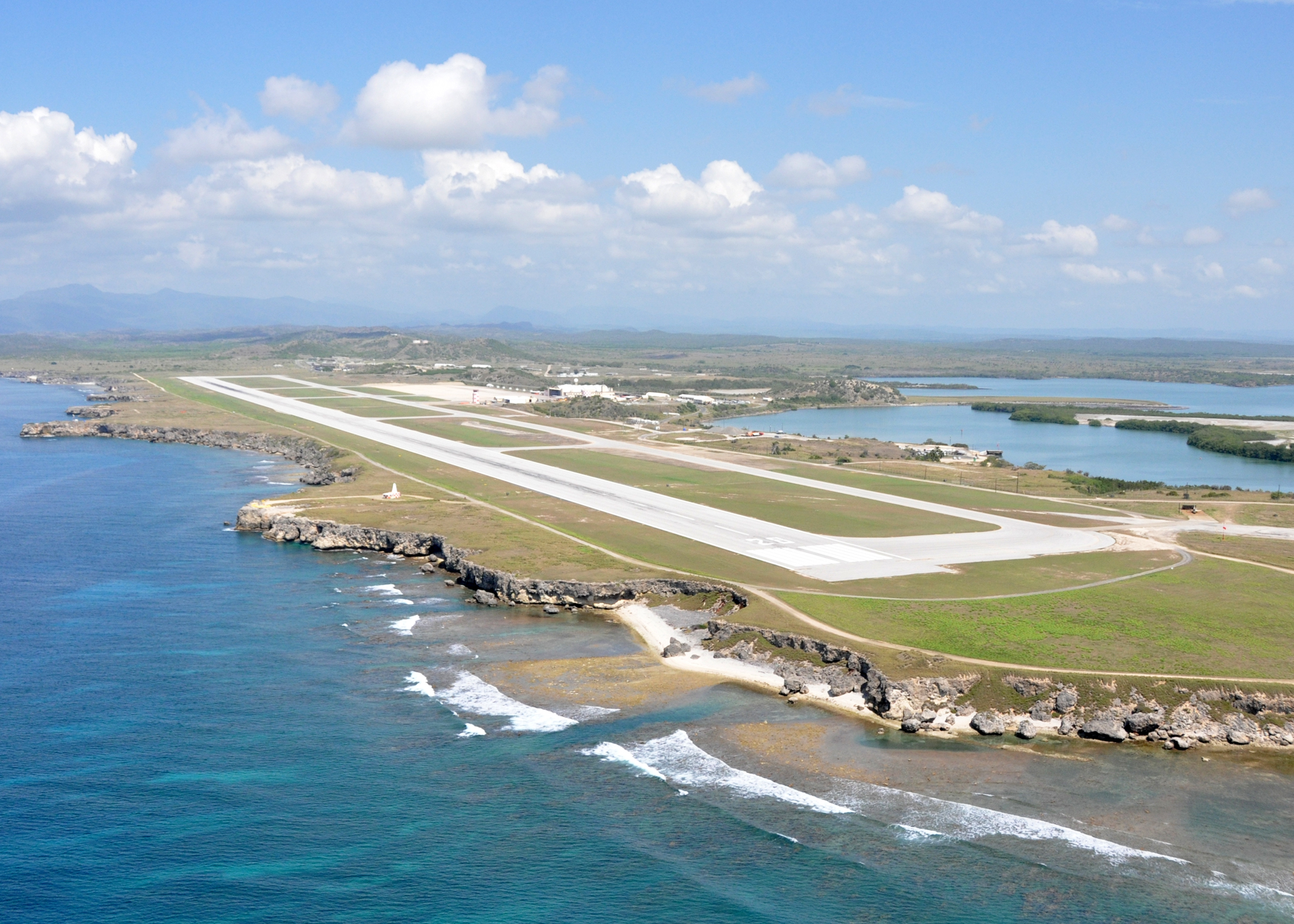
- Aerial view, 6 May 2010
- IATA: NBW; ICAO: MUGM

Summary
- Airport type: Military
- Operator: United States Navy
- Location: Guantánamo Bay, Cuba
- Elevation AMSL: 56 ft / 17 m
- Coordinates: 19°54′23″N 075°12′25″W

Map
- Location in Cuba

Runways
Direction	Length		Surface
Direction	ft	m	Surface
10/28	8,000	2,438	Asphalt
- Source: DAFIF

Leeward Point Field (IATA: NBW, ICAO: MUGM), also known as Leeward Airfield, is a U.S. military airfield located at Naval Station Guantanamo Bay in Guantánamo Bay, Cuba. On August 18th 1993, a DC-8 freighter crashed in Leeward Point field. All 3 crew members survived.

== Facilities ==
The airport resides at an elevation of 56 ft (17 m) above mean sea level. It has one runway designated 10/28 with an asphalt surface measuring 8,000 ft × 200 ft (2,438 m × 61 m).
