= Fatimah Khatun =

Seljuk princess and wife of caliph al-Muqtafi

Fatima Khatun فاطمة خاتون

Wife of the Abbasid caliph
- Tenure: April 1137 – September 1147
- Died: September 1147; Baghdad
- Spouse: al-Muqtafi
Names
- Fatimah bint Muhammad Tapar al-Seljuki
- Dynasty: Seljuk
- Father: Muhammad I Tapar
- Mother: Nistandar Jahan
- Religion: Sunni Islam

Fatima Khatun (Turkish: Fatma Hatun, Arabic: فاطمة خاتون; Persian: فاطمه خاتون; died September 1147) was a Seljuk princess, daughter of sultan Muhammad I Tapar, sister of sultan Ghiyath ad-Din Mas'ud and principal wife of Abbasid caliph al-Muqtafi.

Fatima's mother was Nistandar Jahan also known ad Sarjahan Khatun. Sultan Ghiyath ad-Din Mas'ud was her full-brother. After Muhammad's death in 1118, Mengubars, the governor of Iraq, married her mother.

Fatima married caliph al-Muqtafi in March–April 1137. Her dowry was one hundred thousand dinars. The caliph's vizier, Ali ibn Tirad al-Zaynabi, acted as the representative for the acceptance of the marriage contract, while Kamal al-Din al-Darkazini served as the sultan's agent. In 1140, her brother married the caliph's daughter Sayyida Zubayda.Her dowry was one hundred thousand dinars. The wedding procession was delayed for five years because of her young age. However, the marriage was never consummated because of Mas'ud's ultimate death.

According to Ibn-al Jawzi, Fatima could read and write. She died in September 1147, during the Caliphate of her husband.
