= Al-Rashid Billah =

Abbasid caliph in Baghdad (r. 1135–1136)

Al-Rashid bi'llah الراشد بالله
- Khalīfah; Amir al-Mu'minin
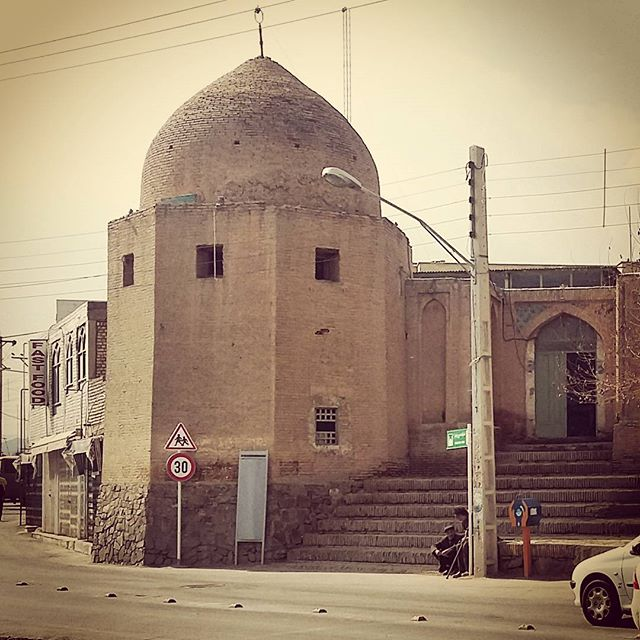
- Mausoleum of Al-Rashid bi'llah

30th Caliph of the Abbasid Caliphate Abbasid Caliph in Baghdad
- Reign: 29 August 1135 – 17 August 1136
- Predecessor: Al-Mustarshid
- Successor: Al-Muqtafi
- Born: 1109; Baghdad, Iraq
- Died: 6 June 1138 (aged 29); Isfahan, Iran
- Burial: Al-Rashid Mausoleum
- Issue: Ja'far
Names
- Abu Ja'far Mansur ibn al-Faḍl al-Mustarshid Al-Rashid bi'llah
Era name and dates
- Later Abbasid era: 12th century
- Dynasty: Abbasid
- Father: Al-Mustarshid
- Mother: Khushf
- Religion: Sunni Islam

Abu Ja'far al-Mansur ibn al-Faḍl al-Mustarshid bi'llah (Arabic: أبو جعفر المنصور بن الفضل المسترشد بالله; 1109 – 6 June 1138) usually known by his regnal name Al-Rashid bi'llah (Arabic: الراشد بالله) was the Abbasid caliph in Baghdad from 1135 to 1136. He succeeded his father al-Mustarshid in the year 1135. He ruled for just one year from 1135 up to his deposition on 17 August 1136 when the populace of Baghdad rose in revolt against him.

== Biography ==
Al-Rashid bi'llah was the son of caliph Al-Mustarshid and his mother was one of Al-Mustarshid's concubines was called Khushf. She was from Iraq, and was the mother of his son Mansur, the future Caliph Al-Rashid Billah. His full name was Mansur ibn al-Faḍl al-Mustarshid and his Kunya was Abu Jaʿfar. He was nominated as heir by his father al-Mustarshid. As a prince, he spend his life in magnificent city of Baghdad. His name was minted on coins of Baghdad also on Seljuq coins along with the Caliph. When his father was mysterious killed in 1135, he smoothly ascended to the throne.

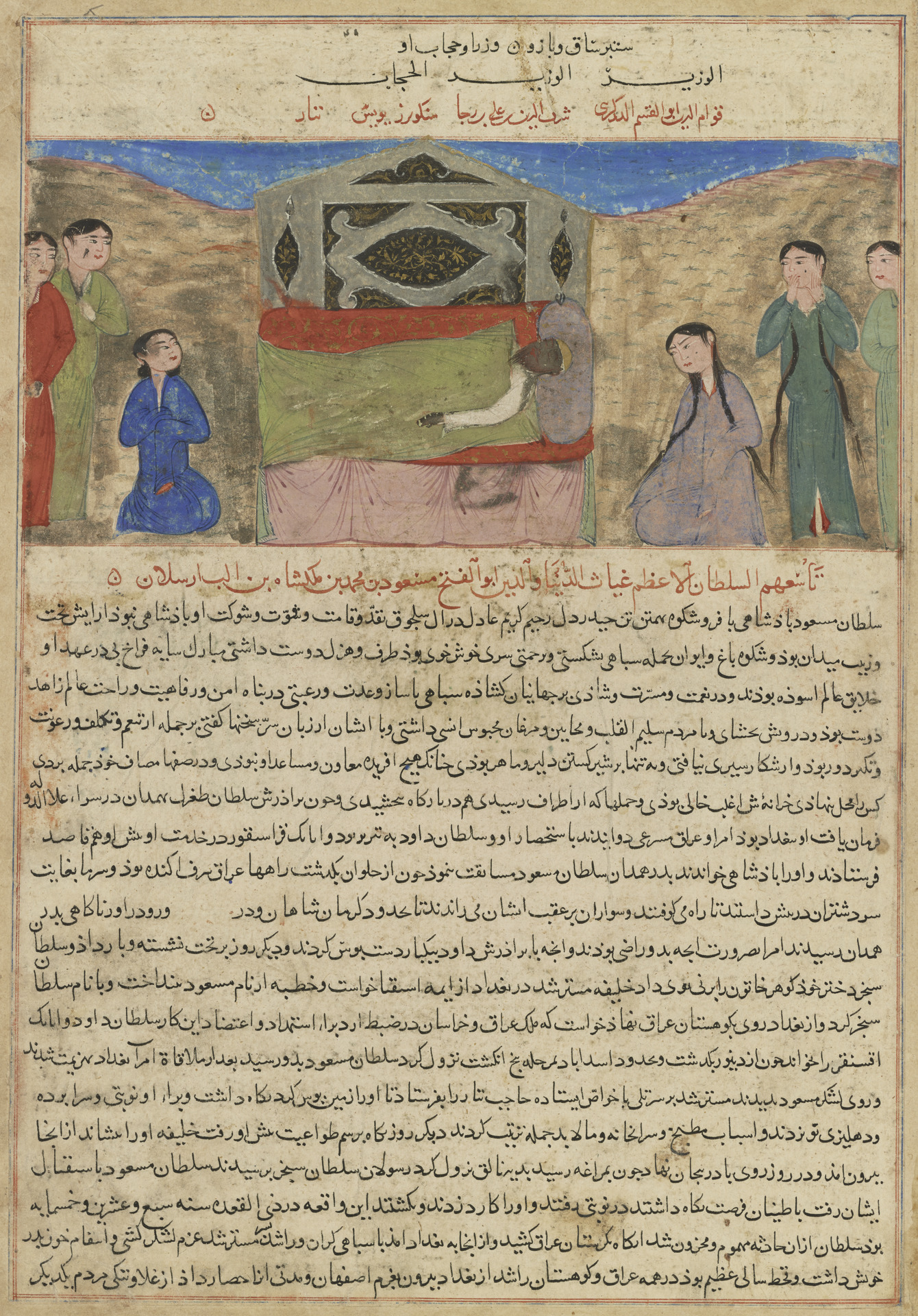
Death of Al-Rashid's father Al-Mustarshid bi-llah who was assassinated in the year 1135 CE

After the defeat of his father, caliph al-Mustarshid against the Seljuks in the battle of Hamadan in June 1135, he was forced to pay an undisclosed sum of war reparations, disband his forces and promise to never campaign again. His father, Al-Mustarshid was, however, murdered (Actually, Nizari Ismailis during Kiya Buzurg's time had created a list of the number of assassinations; the list include the caliph Al-Mustarshid, a prefect of Isfahan, a governor of Maragha, a prefect of Tabriz, and a Qadi of Qazvin.) shortly after and al-Rashid billah rejected to pay the reparations in October 1135, likely because they were excessive. When the envoys of the Seljuk ruler of Iraq, Ghiyath ad-Din Mas'ud, insisted, al-Rashid had them ejected and was soon joined by commanders opposed to Mas'ud such as Imad al-Din Zengi while the Seljuk palace in Bagdhad was plundered. On 22 November the khutba was changed from invoking the name of Great Sultan Ahmad Sanjar and Sultan Mas'ud’s to the name of Dawud. Though Zengi was able to defeat the advance guard of Mas'ud, he retreated to Mosul upon realising that the caliph's commanders were in negotiations with the sultan.

Like his father, al-Mustarshid, al-Rashid made another failed attempt at independence (militarily) from Seljuk Turks. To avenge his father's death, he insulted the envoy of sultan Ghiyath ad-Din Mas'ud who came to demand a heavy largess, incited the mob to plunder his palace, and then, supported by Zengi, who was equally hostile to the sultan because of the murder of Dubais ibn Sadaqah, set up a rival sultan. Mas'ud hastened to the rebellious capital and laid siege to it.

The siege began when the Seljuk ruler of Iraq, Ghiyath ad-Din Mas'ud, attacked the caliph al-Rashid Billah. During the siege, the populace of Baghdad rose in revolt against the caliph, plundering one of caliph's Palaces. In the end, al-Rashid fled the city for Mosul on 14 August and Mas'ud entered the city on 15 August.

Baghdad was a well defended by the river and its canals, resisted the attack; but in the end the caliph and Zengi, hopeless of success, escaped to Mosul. The sultan's power restored, a council was held, the caliph deposed, and his uncle al-Muqtafi was raised to the throne instead by Mas'ud on 18 August, who then retired to the east.

== Death ==
Al-Rashid fled to Isfahan where he was assassinated by a team of four Nizari Ismailis (Assassins) in June 1138. This was celebrated in Alamut for a week.

A Mausoleum was built on his last resting place known as Al-Rashid Mausoleum is a historical mausoleum in Isfahan city. It dates back to the Later Abbasid era of Seljuqs and is located on the northern bank of Zayanderud beside the Shahrestan bridge. This structure is the burial place of Al-Rashid the 30th Abbasid Caliph, who left his palace and fled from Baghdad to Isfahan, when Mahmud captured Baghdad. Two years later, Al-Rashid was stabbed and killed by Hashshashins in 1138. The only decorative element of the mausoleum is a stucco Kufic inscription.

== See also ==
- Ahmad ibn Nizam al-Mulk a vizier of his father al-Mustarshid
- Amira Khatun, wife of al-Mustarshid
- Ibn al-Jawzi was an Arab Muslim jurisconsult, preacher, orator, heresiographer, traditionist, historian, judge, hagiographer, and philologist.

== Sources ==
- Basan, Osman Aziz (2010). The Great Seljuqs: A History. Routledge. ISBN 1136953930.
- Le Strange, Guy (1922). Baghdad During the Abbasid Caliphate. From Contemporary Arabic and Persian Sources (Second ed.). Oxford: Clarendon Press.
- This text is adapted from William Muir's 1924 book The Caliphate: Its Rise, Decline, and Fall, which is in the public domain.

ar-Rashid Abbasid dynasty Cadet branch of the Banu Hashim Born: 1109 Died: 6 June 1138
Sunni Islam titles
Preceded by Al-Mustarshid	Caliph of Islam; Abbasid Caliph; 29 August 1135 – 1136	Succeeded by Al-Muqtafi
