= Satr (Isma'ilism) =

Satr (Arabic: ستر, lit. 'concealment') is a term used by the Isma'ili Shi'a for various periods in their history where the true imam was hidden (mastur) and represented through agents. These periods of concealment (dawr al-satr) might end with the renewed public manifestation of the imam, or continue until the present day. Entering into concealment did not mean that the line of imams stopped with the hidden imam; the Isma'ili concept is thus different from the concept of occultation (ghayba) as conceived by the Twelver Shi'a.

== History ==
=== Pre-Fatimid Isma'ilism ===
The first period of concealment (dawr al-satr) for the Isma'ilis began in 765, with the death of the imam Ja'far al-Sadiq, and lasted until the proclamation of the Fatimid Caliphate in 909, when Abdallah al-Mahdi Billah came forth as imam and caliph.

In the meantime, the Isma'ili imam was hidden (mastur), and his return was expected by the Isma'ili faithful as the mahdi ('the Rightly Guided One') or qa'im ('He Who Arises'), a messiah-like figure that would usher in the end times. For the early Isma'ilis, that mahdi was al-Sadiq's grandson Muhammad ibn Isma'il, who according to the Isma'ili view had escaped Abbasid persecution by going into hiding (and is hence known by the epithet al-Maktum, 'the Hidden'). While the mahdi remained hidden, he was represented by an agent, living proof of the imam's existence, the hujja (lit. 'seal').

Already before his coming to power, al-Mahdi Billah broke with the notion that Muhammad ibn Isma'il was the hidden imam who would return as a messiah bringing the end times, declaring himself as one in a series of imams descended from Muhammad ibn Isma'il, that would continue after him. As a result, the Fatimid-era Isma'ilis accepted the existence of hidden imams (al-a'imma al-masturun) between Muhammad ibn Isma'il and al-Mahdi Billah. According to later tradition, these were Abdallah al-Akbar (the 8th imam), Ahmad (the 9th imam), and al-Mahdi Billah's father, al-Husayn (the 10th imam).

=== Nizari Isma'ilism ===
In 1094, on the death of Caliph al-Mustansir Billah, a succession struggle broke out between his sons, the older Nizar being sidelined by the younger al-Musta'li by the machinations of the vizier al-Afdal Shahanshah. Nizar rose in revolt in Alexandria, but was defeated and executed. This resulted in a schism in the Isma'ili movement into the Nizari and Musta'li branches. The Nizari branch was led by Hasan-i Sabbah in Persia, and found many adherents in the eastern Islamic lands.

For the Nizaris, Nizar's death posed the problem of succession: contemporary sources attest that Nizar had a number of sons, but none had been designated as his successor. In the absence of an imam, coinage from Alamut Castle, the centre of Hasan-i Sabah's nascent Nizari Isma'ili state in central Persia, was minted with Nizar's regnal name of al-Mustafa li-Din Allah until 1162. However, the Nizaris soon came to believe that a grandson (or son) of Nizar had been smuggled out of Egypt and brought to Alamut, and was the rightful imam, living in concealment. Once again, the hidden imams were publicly represented by hujjas, in the person of Hasan and his successors. Three such hidden imams are held by modern Nizaris to have lived in Alamut in concealment: Ali al-Hadi, Muhammad (I) al-Muhtadi, and Hasan (I) al-Qahir. This new period of concealment ended in 1164, when the Nizari imam Hasan II re-emerged in what is known as the qiyama.

In later times, the Nizaris developed the concept of (satr) further: instead of the physical concealment of the imam, it came to mean a period in which the spiritual truth (haqa'iq) had to be concealed; thus it became synonymous with the practice of taqiyya, the dissimulation of one's true belief, up to and including the outward adoption of Sunni Islam, which was decreed by the imam Hasan III (r. 1210–1221).

=== Tayyibi Isma'ilism ===
In October 1130, Caliph al-Amir bi-Ahkam Allah was murdered by Nizari agents. He left only an infant son, Abu'l-Qasim al-Tayyib, born a few months before. In the power struggle that followed, al-Tayyib disappeared, and his uncle, al-Hafiz, assumed the caliphate and imamate in 1132. This breach of the father-to-son succession caused a schism in Musta'li Isma'ilism, between those who accepted al-Hafiz (the 'Hafizis'), and those—mostly in Yemen—who upheld the rights of al-Tayyib (the 'Tayyibis').

The fate of al-Tayyib is unknown, as he disappears from the sources after al-Amir's death. Modern historians speculate that he either died in infancy or was killed by one of the contenders for power. The Tayyibi faithful, however, hold that al-Tayyib did not die, but that he had been entrusted by al-Amir to a certain Ibn Madyan, and that the infant had been hidden by Ibn Madyan and his helpers when Kutayfat came to power. Ibn Madyan was killed by Kutayfat, but his brother-in-law escaped with al-Tayyib, who now went into concealment. Al-Tayyib is held to have died while still in concealment, but to have had descendants, who have provided a series of hidden imams that continue to the present day. The public leadership of the Tayyibi community was instead assumed by a succession of 'absolute missionaries' (da'i al-mutlaq).

== Cosmology ==
The concept of satr is also an important part of Isma'ili cosmology, according to which the history of mankind comprises seven cycles (dawr). The first six are eras of concealment, where the inner (batin) truth of religion has to be concealed behind outer (zahir) forms, i.e. religious precepts and laws. These truths would be revealed openly during the seventh era, a 'cycle of manifestation' (dawr al-kashf) inaugurated by the qa'im and culminating in the end times.

The Tayyibis further elaborated this scheme into an uninterrupted series of cycles composed of seven eras, where a cycle of concealment would be followed by one of manifestation. This process is held to culminate in the great resurrection (qiyamat al-qiyamat) that would be heralded by the final qa'im.

== Sources ==
- Brett, Michael (2017). The Fatimid Empire. The Edinburgh History of the Islamic Empires. Edinburgh: Edinburgh University Press. ISBN 978-0-7486-4076-8.
- Daftary, Farhad (2004). "Satr". In Bearman, P. J.; Bianquis, Th.; Bosworth, C. E.; van Donzel, E. & Heinrichs, W. P. (eds.). The Encyclopaedia of Islam, Second Edition. Volume XII: Supplement. Leiden: E. J. Brill. pp. 712–713. doi:10.1163/1573-3912_islam_SIM_8888. ISBN 978-90-04-13974-9.
- Daftary, Farhad (2007). The Ismāʿı̄lı̄s: Their History and Doctrines (Second ed.). Cambridge: Cambridge University Press. ISBN 978-0-521-61636-2.
- Halm, Heinz (1991). Das Reich des Mahdi: Der Aufstieg der Fatimiden [The Empire of the Mahdi: The Rise of the Fatimids] (in German). Munich: C. H. Beck. ISBN 978-3-406-35497-7.
