= Nizar ibn al-Mustansir =

Fatimid prince and Nizari imam (1045–1095)

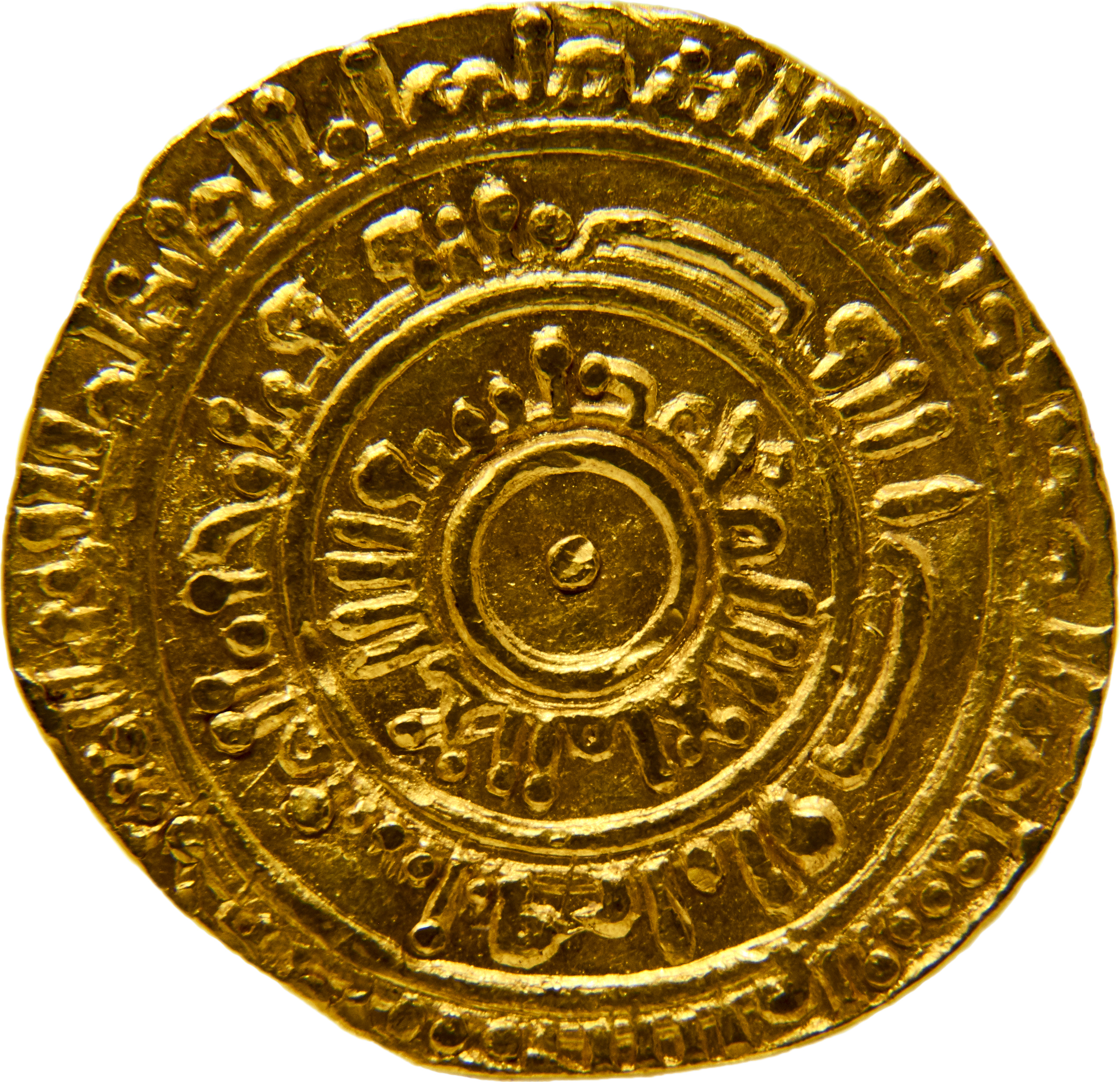
- Gold dinar minted in the name of Nizar at Alexandria in 1095
- Born: 26 September 1045; Cairo, Egypt
- Died: c. November/December 1095 (aged 50); Cairo, Egypt
- Cause of death: Immurement
- Title: Imam of Nizari Isma'ilism
- Term: 1094–1095
- Predecessor: al-Mustansir Billah
- Successor: Ali al-Hadi (in concealment)
- Children: Ali al-Hadi ibn Nizar
- Father: al-Mustansir Billah
- Family: Fatimid dynasty

Abu Mansur Nizar ibn al-Mustansir (Arabic: أبو منصور نزار بن المستنصر, romanized: Abū Manṣūr Nizār ibn al-Mustanṣir; 1045–1095) was a Fatimid prince, and the oldest son of the eighth Fatimid caliph and eighteenth Isma'ili imam, al-Mustansir. When his father died in December 1094, the powerful vizier, al-Afdal Shahanshah, raised Nizar's younger brother al-Musta'li to the throne in Cairo, bypassing the claims of Nizar and other older sons of al-Mustansir. Nizar escaped Cairo, rebelled and seized Alexandria, where he reigned as caliph with the regnal name al-Mustafa li-Din Allah (Arabic: المصطفى لدين الله, romanized: al-Muṣṭafā li-Dīn Allāh). In late 1095 he was defeated and taken prisoner to Cairo, where he was executed by immurement.

During the 12th century, some of Nizar's actual or claimed descendants tried, without success, to seize the throne from the Fatimid caliphs. Many Isma'ilis, especially in Persia, rejected al-Musta'li's imamate and considered Nizar as the rightful imam. As a result, they split off from the Fatimid regime and founded the Nizari branch of Isma'ilism, with their own line of imams who claimed descent from Nizar. This line continues to this day in the person of the Aga Khan.

== Life ==
Nizar was born on 26 September 1045 (5 Rabīʿ al-ʾAwwal 437 A.H.) to the ruling Fatimid imam–caliph, al-Mustansir (r. 1036–1094). At that time, al-Mustansir was around 15 years old and had already been on the throne for ten years. Nizar was most likely the eldest son of the caliph, although another son named Abu Abdallah is sometimes listed as the senior of al-Mustansir's sons. (Note: The long reign of al-Mustansir ensured that he had numerous offspring, but no complete list exists, and many of his sons shared parts of their names, making their identification difficult. Historian Paul E. Walker estimated that al-Mustansir "had at the minimum seventeen sons whose names we can recover".)

In the late 1060s, the Fatimid Caliphate entered a profound crisis, with the advance of the Seljuk Turks from the east threatening its hold over Syria, and protracted clashes between the Fatimid army's Turkish and black African troops in Egypt leading to the breakdown of the central government and widespread famine and anarchy. In about 1068, as internal turmoil threatened the dynasty with collapse, al-Mustansir dispersed his sons throughout his territories as a safeguard, keeping only an unnamed underage son close to him. The account by the Mamluk-era historian al-Maqrizi says that Abu Abdallah and Abu Ali were to go to Acre to join the army of the commander Badr al-Jamali; Abu'l-Qasim Muhammad (father of the Caliph al-Hafiz) to Ascalon; while another, unnamed but underage son, remained in Cairo. Nizar is not mentioned by al-Maqrizi, but he was very likely included in this measure, and the al-Hidaya al-Amiriyya, a proclamation issued in 1122 by Caliph al-Amir (r. 1101–1130), claims that he was sent to the port of Damietta. This dispersal of the Fatimid princes lasted at least until Badr al-Jamali assumed power in 1073 as vizier and quasi-dictator and restored order in Egypt.

=== Disputed succession ===
As the oldest son, Nizar was apparently considered to be his father's most likely successor, as was the custom; indeed, historians often state that Nizar had been his father's designated (Note: The concept of designation (nass) is central to the early Shi'a, and particularly the Isma'ili, concept of the imamate, but it also presented complications: as the imam possessed God's infallibility (isma), he could not possibly err, especially in the selection of his heir. Appointed heirs predeceasing their fathers were a source of considerable embarrassment, and therefore, while an heir might be clearly favoured during his father's reign, nass was often withheld until shortly before the ruling imam's death, proclaimed in the latter's testament, or left as a bequest with a third party.) successor. However, no formal designation of Nizar as heir seems to have taken place by the time of al-Mustansir's death in December 1094.

Al-Maqrizi writes that this was due to the machinations of Badr's son al-Afdal Shahanshah, who had succeeded his father to the vizierate in June 1094. According to al-Maqrizi, a deep-seated enmity existed between al-Afdal and Nizar. An anecdote tells how al-Afdal had once tried to enter the palace on horseback—a privilege reserved for the caliph—whereupon Nizar yelled at him to dismount and called him a "dirty Armenian". Since then, the two had been bitter enemies, with al-Afdal obstructing Nizar's activities and demoting his servants, while at the same time winning the army's commanders over to his cause. Only one of them, the Berber Muhammad ibn Masal al-Lukki, is said to have remained loyal to Nizar, because he had promised to appoint him vizier instead of al-Afdal.

According to al-Maqrizi, al-Afdal pressured al-Mustansir to prevent Nizar's public nomination as heir, and when the caliph died, al-Afdal raised a much younger (Note: Al-Musta'li was apparently the youngest of all of al-Mustansir's sons.) half-brother of Nizar, al-Musta'li, to the throne and the imamate. (Note: An imam is a spiritual leader of the Islamic community of the faithful (ummah) as successor of Muhammad. After the civil wars of the early Muslim period, the Sunni mainstream followed the caliphs as successors of Muhammad and attached few conditions to leadership positions. On the other hand, the Shi'a gradually developed the notion of the imam as a singular, divinely invested and guided successor of Muhammad, a figure endowed with unique qualities and the living proof (hujja) of God. The position was reserved for a member of the family of Muhammad, with Muhammad's son-in-law Ali ibn Abi Talib considered as the first such imam. The Twelver Shi'a and Isma'ili (or Sevener) branches split after the death of Ja'far al-Sadiq in 765. The Twelvers followed Musa al-Kadhim as their seventh imam and end the line of their imams with al-Mahdi, the twelfth and final imam who went into occultation in 874 and whose messianic return is still awaited. The various Isma'ili branches follow the line of succession from Isma'il ibn Jafar through a continuous sequence of both public and hidden imams, including the Fatimid imam-caliphs, to the present day.) Al-Musta'li, who had shortly before married al-Afdal's sister, was completely dependent on al-Afdal for his accession. This made him a compliant figurehead who was unlikely to threaten al-Afdal's recent, and therefore as yet fragile, hold on power.

In order to defend al-Musta'li's succession and counter the claims of Nizar's partisans, al-Mu'stali's son and successor, al-Amir, issued the al-Hidaya al-Amiriyya. This document puts a different spin on the dispersal of the princes: supposedly, they were sent away in order of importance, with those closest to Cairo (and thus the caliph himself) being the highest in rank. Modern historians point out that this was a deliberately misconstrued argument, as the princes were sent away for their protection. According to the historian Paul E. Walker, sending Abu Abdallah to the strong army of Badr al-Jamali was, if anything, an indication of his high importance and of his father's desire to keep him safe. At the same time, the unidentified underage son left in Cairo was clearly not al-Musta'li, who had not even been born yet. Walker identifies the unnamed prince with Abu'l-Qasim Ahmad, whose birth had been publicly announced in 1060. That prince had likely died in the meantime, as the future al-Musta'li, born in 1074, was given the same name.

The al-Hidaya al-Amiriyya and other accounts further assert the legitimacy of al-Musta'li's accession by reporting stories that at the wedding banquet of al-Musta'li, or on his deathbed, al-Mustansir had chosen him as his heir, and that one of al-Mustansir's sisters is said to have been called to him privately and received al-Musta'li's nomination as a bequest. Modern historians, such as Farhad Daftary, believe these stories to be most likely attempts to justify and retroactively legitimize what was in effect a coup d'état by al-Afdal.

However, al-Maqrizi also includes a different narrative that casts doubt on whether al-Afdal's move was really a carefully prepared coup. When al-Afdal summoned three of al-Mustansir's sons—Nizar, Abdallah, and Isma'il, apparently the most prominent among the caliph's progeny—to the palace to do homage to al-Musta'li, who had been seated on the throne, they each refused. Not only did they reject al-Musta'li, but each of them claimed that al-Mustansir had chosen him as his successor. Nizar claimed that he had a written document to this effect. This refusal apparently took al-Afdal completely by surprise. The brothers were allowed to leave the palace; but while Abdallah and Isma'il made for a nearby mosque, Nizar immediately fled Cairo. To add to the confusion, having learned of al-Mustansir's passing, Baraqat, the chief missionary (da'i) of Cairo (the head of the Isma'ili religious establishment) proclaimed Abdallah as caliph with the regnal name al-Muwaffaq. However, al-Afdal soon regained control. Baraqat was arrested (and later executed), Abdallah and Isma'il were placed under surveillance and eventually publicly acknowledged al-Musta'li. A grand assembly of officials was held, which acclaimed al-Musta'li as imam and caliph.

=== Rebellion and death ===
In the meantime, Nizar fled to Alexandria with a few followers. The local governor, a Turk named Nasr al-Dawla Aftakin, opposed al-Afdal, so Nizar was quickly able to gain his support. He also won over the local judge (qadi), the inhabitants and the surrounding Arab tribes to his cause. He then rose in revolt and proclaimed himself imam and caliph with the title of al-Mustafa li-Din Allah ('the Chosen One for God's Religion'). A gold dinar of Nizar, bearing this title, was discovered in 1994, attesting to his assumption of the caliphal title and the minting of coinage with it. According to Walker, the speed with which Nizar gained support, and some other stories narrated in al-Maqrizi, suggest the existence of a relatively large faction that expected or wanted him to succeed al-Mustansir.

Nizar's revolt was initially successful: al-Afdal's attack on Alexandria in February 1095 was easily repulsed, and Nizar's forces raided up to the outskirts of Cairo. Over the next months, however, al-Afdal managed to win back the allegiance of the Arab tribes with bribes and gifts. Weakened, Nizar's forces were pushed back to Alexandria, which was placed under siege. In November, Nizar's military commander Ibn Masal abandoned the city, taking most of the remaining treasure with him. This forced Aftakin and Nizar to surrender against a guarantee of their safety (aman). Both were taken back to Cairo, where Nizar was immured and Aftakin was executed. The details or exact date of Nizar's death are unknown.

In a surviving letter sent to the Isma'ili Yemeni queen Arwa al-Sulayhi announcing his accession, al-Musta'li gives the "official" version of events as follows: Like the other sons of al-Mustansir, Nizar had at first accepted his imamate and paid him homage, before being moved by greed and envy to revolt. The events up to the capitulation of Alexandria are reported in some detail, but nothing is mentioned of Nizar's fate or that of Aftakin.

== Nizari schism ==
Problems with succession arrangements had emerged before, but al-Musta'li's accession was the first time that rival members of the Fatimid dynasty had actually fought over the throne. Given the pivotal role of the imam in the Isma'ili faith, this was of momentous importance: the issue of succession was not merely a matter of political intrigue, but also intensely religious. In the words of the modern pioneer of Isma'ili studies, Samuel Miklos Stern, "on it depended the continuity of institutional religion as well as the personal salvation of the believer". To the Isma'ili faithful, writes Stern, it was "not so much the person of the claimant that weighed with his followers; they were not moved by any superior merits of Nizar as a ruler [...] it was the divine right personified in the legitimate heir that counted".

As a result, the events of 1094–1095 caused a bitter and permanent schism in the Isma'ili movement that continues to the present. While al-Musta'li was recognized by the Fatimid elites and the official Isma'ili religious establishment (the da'wa), as well as the Isma'ili communities dependent on it in Syria and Yemen, most of the Isma'ili communities in the wider Middle East, and especially Persia and Iraq, rejected it. Whether out of genuine conviction, or as a convenient excuse to rid himself of Cairo's control, the chief Isma'ili da'i in Persia, Hassan-i Sabbah, swiftly recognized Nizar's rights to the imamate—possibly already during Nizar's rule in Alexandria—severed relations with Cairo, and set up his own independent hierarchy (the da'wa jadida, lit. 'new calling'). This marked the permanent and enduring split of the Isma'ili movement into rival "Musta'li" and "Nizari" branches.

Over the following decades, the Nizaris were among the most bitter enemies of the Musta'li rulers of Egypt. Hassan-i Sabbah founded the Order of Assassins, which was responsible for the assassination of al-Afdal in 1121, and of al-Musta'li's son and successor al-Amir (who was also al-Afdal's nephew and son-in-law) in October 1130. This led to a succession of coups and crises that heralded the decline of the Fatimid state, and its eventual collapse. In 1130–1131 the Fatimid regime was temporarily abolished by al-Afdal's son Kutayfat, before Nizar's nephew Abd al-Majid, in the absence of a direct heir of al-Amir, assumed the imamate and the caliphate as the caliph al-Hafiz in January 1132. Al-Hafiz' succession led to another schism in Isma'ilism, between those Musta'lis who accepted al-Hafiz' succession (the "Hafizis") and those who did not, upholding instead the imamate of al-Amir's infant son al-Tayyib (the "Tayyibis"). Whereas Nizari Isma'ilism survived in Persia and Syria, and Tayyibi Isma'ilism in Yemen and India, the Hafizi sect, closely associated with the Fatimid state, did not long survive the latter's final abolition by Saladin in 1171.

The Musta'li–Nizari and Hafizi–Tayyibi schisms in the lines of succession of the Isma'ili imamate

al-Mustansir bi'llah (r. 1036–1094)
Abu'l-Qasim Muhammad	al-Musta'li bi'llah (r. 1094–1101)	Abu Mansur Nizar
al-Hafiz li-Din Allah (r. 1132–1149)	al-Amir bi-Ahkam Allah (r. 1101–1130)
al-Tayyib
Hafizi imam-caliphs	Tayyibi hidden imams	Nizari imams

denotes ruling Fatimid caliphs (with regnal dates)
Source: Daftary, Farhad (2007). The Ismāʿı̄lı̄s: Their History and Doctrines (Second ed.). Cambridge: Cambridge University Press. p. 508. ISBN 978-0-521-61636-2.

== Descendants and succession ==
Contemporary sources attest that Nizar had a number of sons. At least one of them, al-Husayn, fled with other members of the dynasty (including three of Nizar's brothers, Muhammad, Isma'il, and Tahir) from Egypt to the western Maghreb in 1095, where they formed a sort of opposition in exile to the new regime in Cairo. There are indications that another of Nizar's sons, named al-Mukhtar Muhammad, left for Yemen, as coins in his name were minted there. In 1132, following the highly irregular accession of al-Hafiz, al-Husayn tried to return to Egypt. He managed to raise an army, but al-Hafiz successfully suborned his commanders and had him killed. In 1149, al-Hafiz had to confront a similar threat by a purported son of Nizar. The pretender managed to recruit a large following among the Berbers, but he was also killed when the Fatimid caliph bribed his commanders. The last revolt by a Nizari claimant was by al-Husayn's son Muhammad in 1162, but he was lured with false promises and executed by the vizier Ruzzik ibn Tala'i.

None of his sons had been formally designated as successor by Nizar, however, so they lacked the legitimacy to become imams after him. This raised an acute problem for the Nizari faithful, as Isma'ili doctrine held that a line of divinely ordained imams could not possibly be broken. At first, some Nizaris held that Nizar was not dead, but would return as the Islamic messiah, the Mahdi (or at least in his company). In the absence of an imam, coinage from Alamut Castle, the centre of Hassan-i Sabah's nascent Nizari Isma'ili state in central Persia, was minted with Nizar's regnal name of al-Mustafa li-Din Allah until 1162. No imam was named publicly at Alamut until then, and Hassan-i Sabbah and his two immediate successors ruled instead as da'is, or as hujjas ('seals', 'proofs'), representatives acting on behalf of the absent imam. However, the Nizaris soon came to believe that a grandson (or son) of Nizar had been smuggled out of Egypt and brought to Alamut, and was the rightful imam, living in concealment (satr).

According to Nizari tradition, the fourth ruler of Alamut, Hassan II (r. 1162–1166), is considered to have been no longer a simple da'i, but secretly a descendant of Nizar and the rightful imam, although this claim was not made explicit until the reign of his son, Nur al-Din Muhammad II. Modern Nizari tradition holds that three imams—Ali al-Hadi, Muhammad (I) al-Muhtadi, and Hassan (I) al-Qahir—ruled after Nizar while in concealment, but various primary sources give different genealogies. According to the German scholar of Shi'ism, Heinz Halm, the identities of the three concealed imams are most likely fictional, and the veracity of Hasan II's claims to Fatimid descent remains a major historiographical issue. Nevertheless, Hassan II's successors have sustained their claim of descent from Nizar down to the current imam of Nizari Isma'ilism, the Aga Khan.

== Sources ==
- Andani, Khalil (2016). "A Survey of Ismaili Studies Part 2: Post-Fatimid and Modern Ismailism". Religion Compass. 10 (11): 269–282. doi:10.1111/rec3.12222.
- Brett, Michael (2017). The Fatimid Empire. The Edinburgh History of the Islamic Empires. Edinburgh: Edinburgh University Press. ISBN 978-0-7486-4076-8.
- Daftary, Farhad (2007). The Ismāʿı̄lı̄s: Their History and Doctrines (Second ed.). Cambridge: Cambridge University Press. ISBN 978-0-521-61636-2.
- Gibb, H. A. R. (1993). "al-Mustaʿlī bi'llāh". In Bosworth, C. E.; van Donzel, E.; Heinrichs, W. P. & Pellat, Ch. (eds.). The Encyclopaedia of Islam, Second Edition. Volume VII: Mif–Naz. Leiden: E. J. Brill. p. 725. ISBN 978-90-04-09419-2.
- Gibb, H. A. R. (1995). "Nizār b. al-Mustanṣir". In Bosworth, C. E.; van Donzel, E.; Heinrichs, W. P. & Lecomte, G. (eds.). The Encyclopaedia of Islam, Second Edition. Volume VIII: Ned–Sam. Leiden: E. J. Brill. p. 83. ISBN 978-90-04-09834-3.
- Halm, Heinz (2014). Kalifen und Assassinen: Ägypten und der vordere Orient zur Zeit der ersten Kreuzzüge, 1074–1171 [Caliphs and Assassins: Egypt and the Near East at the Time of the First Crusades, 1074–1171] (in German). Munich: C.H. Beck. ISBN 978-3-406-66163-1.
- Madelung, W. (1971). "Imāma". In Lewis, B.; Ménage, V. L.; Pellat, Ch. & Schacht, J. (eds.). The Encyclopaedia of Islam, Second Edition. Volume III: H–Iram. Leiden: E. J. Brill. pp. 1163–1169. OCLC 495469525.
- Stern, S. M. (1950). "The Epistle of the Fatimid Caliph al-Āmir (al-Hidāya al-Āmiriyya): Its Date and Its Purpose". The Journal of the Royal Asiatic Society of Great Britain and Ireland. 82 (1): 20–31. doi:10.1017/S0035869X00103284. JSTOR 25222370.
- Stern, S. M. (1951). "The Succession to the Fatimid Imam al-Āmir, the Claims of the Later Fatimids to the Imamate, and the Rise of Ṭayyibī Ismailism". Oriens. 4 (2): 193–255. doi:10.2307/1579511. JSTOR 1579511.
- Walker, Paul E. (1995). "Succession to Rule in the Shiite Caliphate". Journal of the American Research Center in Egypt. 32: 239–264. doi:10.2307/40000841. JSTOR 40000841.
- Walker, Paul E. (2022). "Nizār b. al-Mustanṣir". In Fleet, Kate; Krämer, Gudrun; Matringe, Denis; Nawas, John; Rowson, Everett (eds.). Encyclopaedia of Islam (3rd ed.). Brill Online. ISSN 1873-9830.

Nizar ibn al-Mustansir Fatimid dynasty Born: 1045 Died: 1095
Regnal titles
Preceded by Al-Mustansir	Fatimid Caliph (claimant in Alexandria); 1095	Succeeded by Al-Musta'li
Shia Islam titles
Preceded by Al-Mustansir	19th Imam of Nizari Isma'ilism; 1094–1095	Succeeded by Ali al-Hadi ibn Nizar (in concealment)
