= Abu'l-Qasim al-Tayyib =

Last known imam of the Tayyibi Isma'ilis (born 1130)

Abū'l-Qāsim al-Ṭayyib أبو القاسم الطيب
- Born: February/March 1130; Cairo
- Title: Imam of Tayyibi Isma'ili Shia Islam
- Term: 7 October 1130 – unknown
- Predecessor: al-Amir bi-Ahkam Allah
- Successor: Imam Taiyeb
- Movement: Tayyibi Musta'li Isma'ili Shia Islam
- Parent: al-Amir bi-Ahkam Allah (father)

Abū'l-Qāsim al-Ṭayyib ibn al-Āmir (أبو القاسم الطيب بن الآمر) was, according to the Tayyibi sect of Isma'ilism, the twenty-first imam. The only son of Caliph al-Amir bi-Ahkam Allah, al-Tayyib was an infant when his father was murdered. Amidst the ensuing power struggle, al-Tayyib disappeared; modern historians suggest that he died or was secretly killed by one of the rival strongmen. By 1132, his uncle al-Hafiz declared himself as the caliph and imam in succession to al-Amir. This was not accepted by the Yemeni Isma'ilis, who upheld the rights of al-Tayyib.

This marked the creation of two rival sects of Musta'li Isma'ilism, the Hafizi, following al-Hafiz, and the Tayyibi, following al-Tayyib. The Tayyibis hold that al-Tayyib was rescued from Cairo and brought to safety, but that he and all subsequent Tayyibi imams remained in concealment. The Tayyibi community has instead been led by a sequence of 'absolute missionaries' (da'i al-mutlaq).

== Life ==
Al-Tayyib was the only son of the twentieth Fatimid imam-caliph, al-Amir bi-Ahkam Allah, who ruled Egypt from 1101 to 1130. Al-Tayyib was born in Cairo in February/March 1130, and immediately, according to one source, designated as heir-apparent. Al-Amir was assassinated on 7 October of the same year by agents of the rival Nizari sect of Isma'ili Shi'ism.

=== Power struggle ===
With only an infant child as potential heir, the dynasty's authority devolved on to al-Amir's cousin, Abd al-Majid, as the oldest surviving male of the dynasty. What happened next appears to have effectively been a coup: two of al-Amir's favourites, Hizar al-Mulk Hazarmard (or Jawarmard) and Barghash, who had influence over the army, allied themselves with Abd al-Majid, to control the government. Abd al-Majid, who may have had his eyes on the caliphate, was to become regent.

It is unclear, however, in whose name Abd al-Maji's regency was exercised. Most sources report that even the existence of al-Tayyib was concealed, and he disappears completely from the record after that. How the existence of a child, whose birth had been accompanied by public celebrations and proclamations, was so effectively concealed is unknown. Modern scholars speculate that al-Tayyib may have died in infancy, possibly even before his father; but at least one contemporary anonymous Syrian source maintains that he was murdered on Abd al-Majid's orders.

As a result of this silence in official sources, al-Tayyib's existence was doubted by some early scholars of Isma'ilism in the 20th century. His historicity is now considered as established, based on several points: surviving reports of festivities ordered by al-Amir to celebrate his birth survive, scattered references to him in 12th-century historians, and a surviving example, sent to the Yemeni queen Arwa al-Sulayhi, of the letters sent to friendly rulers to announce the event.

=== Hafizi–Tayyibi schism ===
The rival lines of succession of the Isma'ili imams resulting from the Musta'li–Nizari and Hafizi–Tayyibi schisms

Instead of al-Tayyib, the new regime maintained that al-Amir had left a pregnant concubine, and that the caliph, having dreamed of his impending death, had declared this unborn child to be a son and his designated (nass) successor, thus effectively bypassing al-Tayyib. What came of this pregnancy is likewise unclear, as different sources report that the concubine either bore a daughter or that the foetus could not be found, or that Abd al-Majid killed the baby soon after. The only dissenting account is that of the 15th-century Tayyibi leader and historian Idris Imad al-Din, who explicitly claims that Abd al-Majid took office as regent for al-Tayyib. Whatever the truth, the new regime did not last long, as the army mutinied and installed Kutayfat as vizier. Initially Kutayfat retained Abd al-Majid as regent, but the latter was de facto a prisoner; soon Kutayfat proclaimed the dynasty deposed altogether, and abandoned Isma'ilism as the state religion in favour of a vaguely Twelver form of Shi'ism with himself as vicegerent of a hidden imam. The historian Heinz Halm considers it likely that Kutayfat at this point eliminated al-Tayyib.

Kutayfat was assassinated by Fatimid loyalists in December 1131, and Abd al-Majid was released from his prison. Abd al-Majid initially resumed ruling as a regent, but on 23 January 1132 he proclaimed himself imam and caliph in succession to al-Amir with the regnal name of al-Hafiz. Al-Hafiz's highly irregular accession and claims to the imamate were largely accepted by the Isma'ili faithful in the Fatimid domains in Egypt, Nubia, and the Levant, but rebuffed by some communities. Most notably, this was the case in the only other major Isma'ili realm, Yemen, where Queen Arwa upheld the rights of al-Tayyib, while the subordinate regional dynasties of the Hamdanids and the Zurayids recognised al-Hafiz's claims. Al-Hafiz's accession thus produced a major schism in the Musta'li branch of Isma'ilism, between the adherents of the imamate of al-Tayyib (the 'Tayyibis') pitted against supporters of al-Hafiz and his successors (the 'Hafizis').

The Tayyibis hold that al-Tayyib did not die, but that he had been entrusted by al-Amir to a certain Ibn Madyan, and that the infant had been hidden by Ibn Madyan and his helpers when Kutayfat came to power. Ibn Madyan was killed by Kutayfat, but his brother-in-law escaped with al-Tayyib, who now went into concealment. Al-Tayyib is held to have died while still in concealment, but to have had descendants, who have provided a series of hidden imams that continue to the present day. The public leadership of the Tayyibi community was instead assumed by a succession of 'absolute missionaries' (da'i al-mutlaq).

The Musta'li–Nizari and Hafizi–Tayyibi schisms in the lines of succession of the Isma'ili imamate

al-Mustansir bi'llah (r. 1036–1094)
Abu'l-Qasim Muhammad	al-Musta'li bi'llah (r. 1094–1101)	Abu Mansur Nizar
al-Hafiz li-Din Allah (r. 1132–1149)	al-Amir bi-Ahkam Allah (r. 1101–1130)
al-Tayyib
Hafizi imam-caliphs	Tayyibi hidden imams	Nizari imams

denotes ruling Fatimid caliphs (with regnal dates)
Source: Daftary, Farhad (2007). The Ismāʿı̄lı̄s: Their History and Doctrines (Second ed.). Cambridge: Cambridge University Press. p. 508. ISBN 978-0-521-61636-2.

== See also ==
- Muhammad al-Mahdi
- Occultation (Islam)

Preceded by al-Amir bi-Ahkam Allah	Imam of Tayyibi Isma'ilism; 1130–unknown	Concealment of the Tayyibi imams Leadership of the Tayyibi community passes to the Da'i al-Mutlaqs
