= Ali al-Hadi ibn Nizar =

Ismaili Nizari Imam

Al-Hadi: علي الهادي بن نزار 20th Ismaili Nizari Imam Al-Hadi
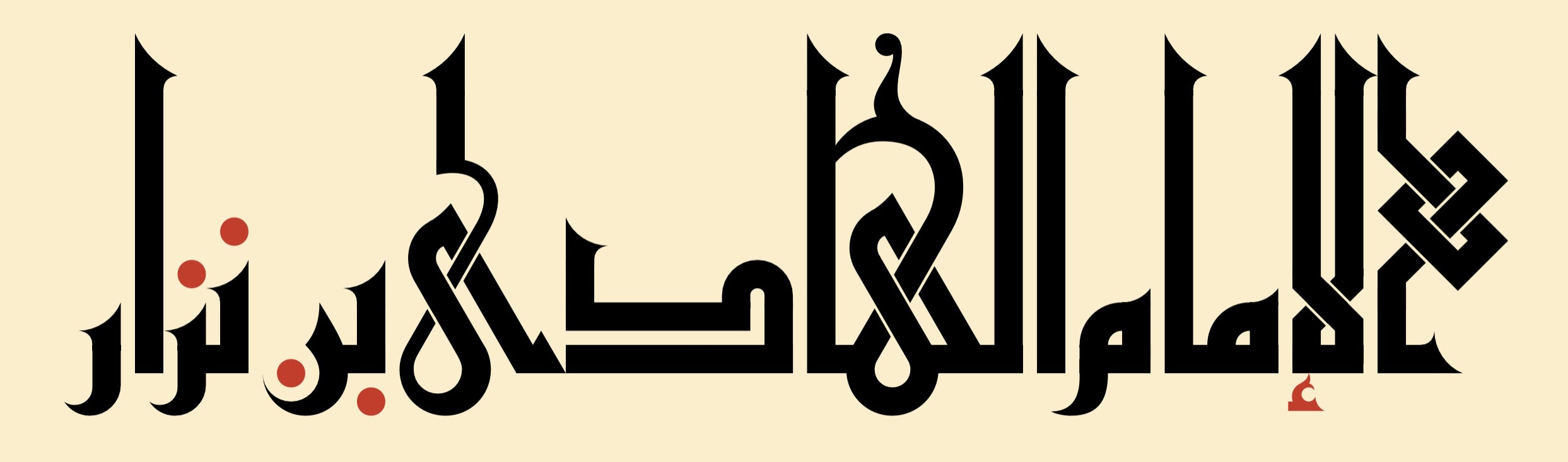
- Born: 470 AH/1076 CE; Cairo
- Died: 530 AH/1136 CE
- Resting place: Lambsar Castle
- Other names: Abu Ali Hasan, or Ali
- Title: al-Hadi الهادي meaning The Guide.
- Term: 490 AH/1097 CE – 530 AH/1136 CE
- Predecessor: Nizar ibn al-Mustansir
- Successor: Al-Muhtadi
- Children: Al-Muhtadi (Nizari imam)

Abū ʿAlī Ḥasan, or ʿAlī, surnamed Al-Hādī (Arabic: علي الهادي بن نزار) (470 AH/1076 CE – 530 AH/1136 CE) was the 20th Ismaili Nizari Imam. Born in Cairo, he was about 17 years old when his predecessor, Imam al-Mustansir, died, and 20 years old during the assumption of his Imamate in 490 AH/1097 CE. Henceforward, the seat of Ismaili Imamate was transferred from Egypt to Persia owing to the division among the Ismailis, where Hasan bin Sabbah had founded the Nizari Ismaili state.

== Name ==
Abu Ali Al-Hasan son of Nizar son of Al-Mustansir Billah. Syrian resources mention his name as Ali Al-Hadi ibn Nizar, علي الهادي بن نزار commonly referred to by the title al-Hadi الهادي meaning The Guide. According to a copy of a letter from the 21st Imam Al-Muhtadi to the Syrian Ismaili, the proper name was Al-Hadi Ali. A careful reading of this important letter composed by his son the 21st Ismaili Nizari Imam Al-Muhtadi may imply that he had a compound name Ali Hassan, because Al-Muhtadi mentioned his father's name both as Ali and Hassan in the same letter.

== Birth and early life in Egypt ==
According to reliable reports he was born in Cairo in 470 AH/1076 CE. Al-Hadi (The Guide) was the son of the Fatimid Ismaili Imam Nizar (died 1095), the eldest son of the Imam al-Mustansir (died 1094) whom he succeeded to the throne.

== Origins of Nizari Isma'ilism in Persia ==
Isma'ilism had deep roots in Persia, with many Persians becoming notable da'is, like Mohamed b. Ahmed al-Nasafi (died 943), Abu Hatim al-Razi (died 934), Abu Ya'qub al-Sijistani, Hamid al-Din al-Kirmani and many others.

Hassan-i Sabbah later took control of the mountain fortress of Alamut in Northern Persia, laying the foundation of what was to become the Nizari Ismaili state of Persia and Syria. At the same time the Ismailis of Persia had started an armed revolt against the Saljuq Turks.

In 1094, a conflict broke out between the Nizar ibn al-Mustansir, the oldest son and heir presumptive of the Fatimid caliph al-Mustansir, and the vizier al-Afdal Shahanshah, who succeeded in raising to the throne al-Musta'li, the younger son of al-Mustansir, instead of Nizar. After a brief conflict, during which Nizar proclaimed himself caliph at Alexandria, he was captured and executed in Cairo.

== Al-Hadi the Concealed Imam (الهادي الإمام المستور) ==
According to the Ismail Nizari tradition Imam al-Hadi was the designated (Nass) as the successor to Nizar.

The period under review denotes the second concealment period Dawr-i Satr دور الستر of the Ismaili history (490-559 AH/1097–1164 CE), wherein three Imams lived in concealment during about 70 years:

1. The 20th Nizari Ismaili Imam al-Hadi الهادي
2. The 21st Nizari Ismaili Imam al-Muhtadi المهتدي
3. The 22nd Nizari Ismaili Imam al-Qahir القاهر
- During this period of concealement, three Ismaili hujjats governed the Nizari state:
1. Hassan-i Sabbah (1090–1124)
2. Kiya Buzrug Ummid (1124–1138)
3. Muhammad bin Kiya (1138–1162)
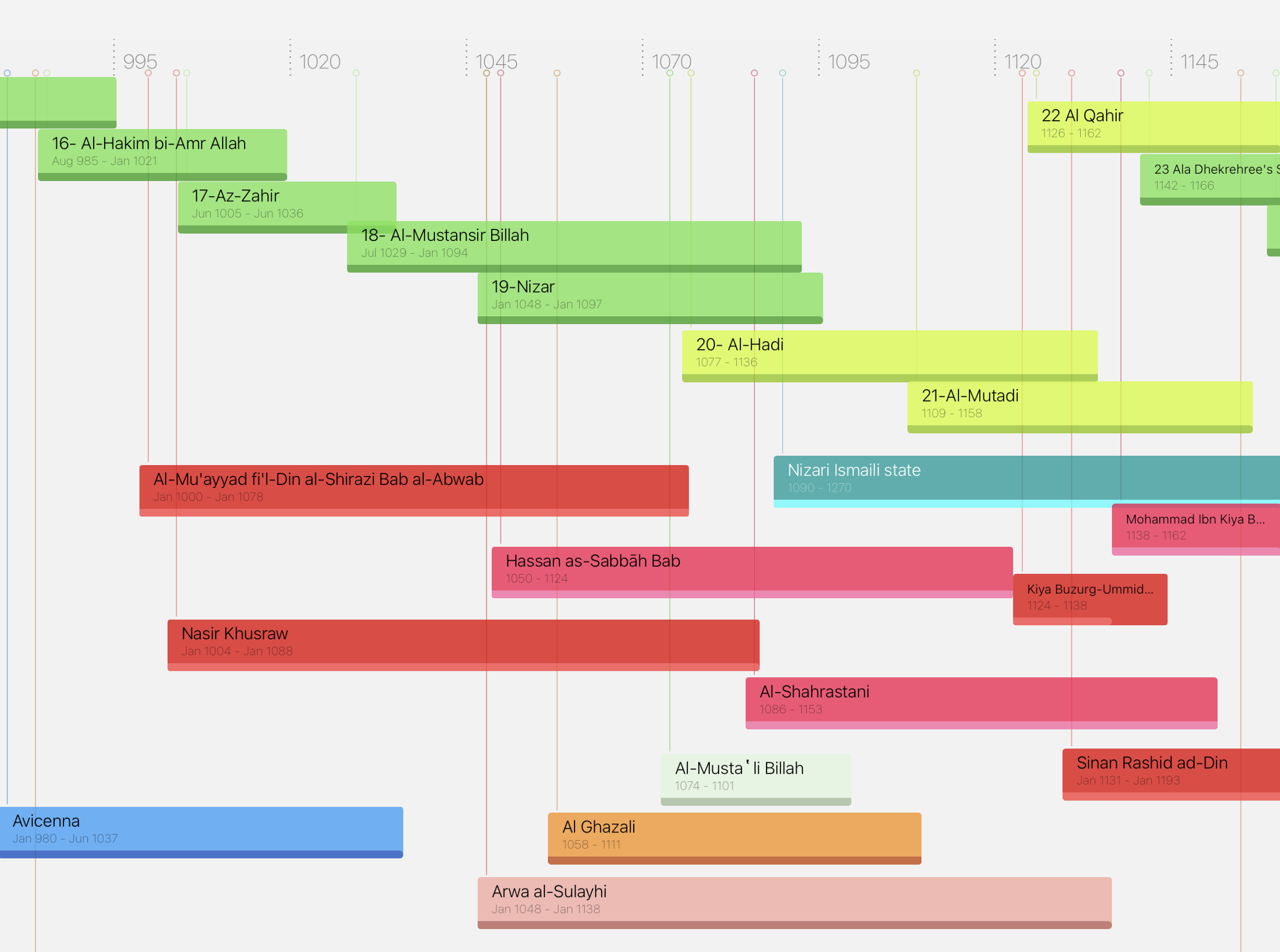
  Timeline depicting the transition of Ismaili Nizari seat from Egypt to Persia between 980 and 1153, with important dates around the 20th Nizari Ismaili Imam Al-Hadi.

Numismatic evidence from the early Alamut period in Nizari Ismaili history reveals that Nizar's name and the caliphate title (al- Mustafa li-Din Allah) continued to appear on coins minted at Alamut for about seventy years (during the concealment period of the Nizari Imams). The Nizari coins have referred to Alamut as kursī ad-Daylam (كرسي الديلم, literally "Capital of Daylam" in Arabic (Chair of Daylam).

There are many narrations about the detention of Imam Nizar or his murder. One of them mentioned by Hafiz Abru states, "Only one of al-Nizar’s sons was arrested with him, and the other son disappeared in Alexandria, who was neither arrested nor recognised." This seems an erroneous account, as the arrested sons were Abu Abdullah al-Hasan and Abu Abdullah al-Hussain, who were prominent faces in the Fatimid court. Under concealment, the third son was Imam Ali al-Hadi, who had managed to escape from Alexandria.

In 1095, a certain Qadi, Abu’l Hasan as-Sa’idi, had moved from Sijilmasa to Persia with Imam al-Hadi or his grandson al-Muhtadi.

After a long and tedious journey, they alighted in the vicinity of Rudhbar, the chief city of Daylam in Iran, after crossing the ranges of Mount Taliqan. Since Alamut was stormed by the Seljuqs at that time, Imam al-Hadi sought safety either in the villages of Rudhbar, or in some other remote place which was only known to Hasan- i Sabbah and no one else.. Al Hadi was taken to the vicinity of Alamut after the restoration of peace. Hasan- i Sabbah facilitated Imam's dwelling in a village at the foot of Alamut. Abu’l Hasan as-Sa’idi is said to have stayed with Imam Hadi for about six months and then returned to Egypt. Imam al-Hadi finally moved his residence to the castle of Lamasar after the death of Hasan bin Sabbah in 518/1124.

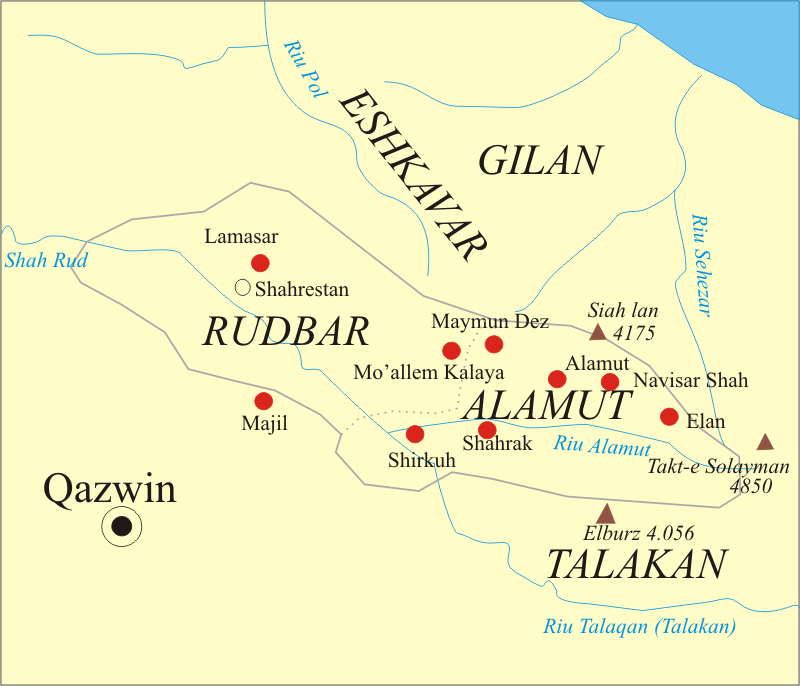
Castles in Alamut

A major part of the life of Imam al-Hadi was in concealment, while the ruling responsibilities were delegated to Hasan bin Sabbah and Kiya Buzrug Ummid. Abu Muhammad al-Iraqi in his al-Firaq (from manuscript # 791 in the library of Sulemaniyya mosque, Istanbul, compiled soon after the fall of Alamut in 654/1256), and Zakariya Qazwini (1203–1283) in Athar al-Bilad wa-Akhbar al-Ibad (comp. in 661/1263) both reaffirm the presence of Imam al-Hadi in Alamut. The Egyptian historian Ibn Muyassar (1231–1278) writes in Tarikh-i Misr (p. 68) that "Hasan-i Sabbah introduced an Imam to his successors during his death-bed."

The tradition widely referenced about Imam al-Hadi's arrival in Iran consists of very meager details, which are cited in the later sources, namely Dabistan al-Mazahib (comp. in 1653), Janat al- Amal (comp. in 1886), Athar-i Muhammadi (comp. in 1893), etc. It states, "It is recounted by the Ismailis of Rudhbar and Kohistan that during the time of Hasan-i Sabbah, one of his trusted Dais, Abu’l Hasan as- Sa’idi, came to Alamut and brought with him a son of Imam al-Nizar bin al- Mustansir, who was a legitimate Imam (Imam al Hadi). Nobody except Hasan-i Sabbah knew about the existence of Imam Hadi with Abu’l Hasan as- Sa’idi. Hasan bin Sabbah treated Abu’l Hasan as-Sa’idi with honour and respect and consequently the Imam decided to dwell in a village at the foot of Alamut. Abu’l Hasan as-Sa’idi was allowed to return after six months. Imam Hadi remained engaged in his spiritual work during the divine the seclusion, and then married a woman in that village, who bore his son, al-Mohtadi (who became the future Imam)."

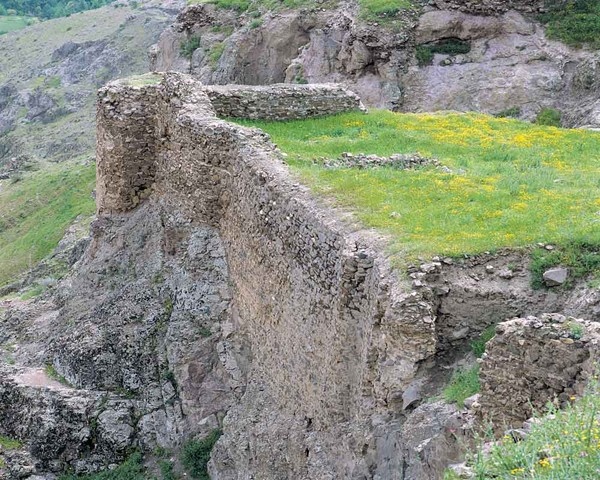
Lambsar (Persian: لمبسر, also pronounced Lamsar) Castle

Imam al-Hadi continued to guide his followers in religious matters through Kiya Buzrug from Lambsar (Persian:لمبسر, also pronounced Lamsar) Castle without making any public appearance. The fragments of the traditions do not reveal much, however, some records mention the existence of an open ground inside the castle of Lamasar, where he used to take an interest in horse riding and horse breeding. It is also said that Imam al-Hadi used to visit the vicinity of Lamasar under the cover of night and distributed food and clothes to the poor villagers.

== Challenges during Al-Hadi Imamat ==
Under the leadership of Hassan-i Sabbah and the following Alamut Lords, the strategy of covert capture was replicated across Persia, Syria and beyond. The Nizari Ismaili developed a unique state of scattered fortresses, surrounded by large areas of enemy territory. They created a power structure that proved more effective than that of Fatimid Cairo or the Seljuk Bagdad, both of which underwent political instability, mainly during the leadership transition. These periods of internal political conflict in Cairo and Baghdad offered the Ismaili state respite from attacks, and even to have such sovereignty as to have minted their own coinage.

== Death ==
Imam al-Hadi died in 530/1136 at the age of 60 in Lambsar (Persian: لمبسر, also pronounced Lamsar) Castle, after bequeathing the office of the Imamate to his son, al-Muhtadi, when Kiya Buzrug was governing the Ismaili state in Alamut.

== Sources ==
- Daftary, Farhad (2007). The Ismāʿı̄lı̄s: Their History and Doctrines (Second ed.). Cambridge: Cambridge University Press. ISBN 978-0-521-61636-2.
- Gibb, H. A. R. (1995). "Nizār b. al-Mustanṣir". In Bosworth, C. E.; van Donzel, E.; Heinrichs, W. P. & Lecomte, G. (eds.). The Encyclopaedia of Islam, Second Edition. Volume VIII: Ned–Sam. Leiden: E. J. Brill. p. 83. ISBN 978-90-04-09834-3.
- Halm, Heinz (2014). Kalifen und Assassinen: Ägypten und der vordere Orient zur Zeit der ersten Kreuzzüge, 1074–1171 [Caliphs and Assassins: Egypt and the Near East at the Time of the First Crusades, 1074–1171] (in German). Munich: C.H. Beck. ISBN 978-3-406-66163-1.
- Stern, S. M. (1951). "The Succession to the Fatimid Imam al-Āmir, the Claims of the Later Fatimids to the Imamate, and the Rise of Ṭayyibī Ismailism". Oriens. 4 (2): 193–255. doi:10.2307/1579511. JSTOR 1579511.
- Walker, Paul E. (1995). "Succession to Rule in the Shiite Caliphate". Journal of the American Research Center in Egypt. 32: 239–264. doi:10.2307/40000841. JSTOR 40000841.
