= Al-Amir bi-Ahkam Allah =

Fatimid caliph and imam from 1101 to 1130

al-Amir bi-Ahkam Allah الآمر بأحكام الله
- Caliph; Amir al-Mu'minīn
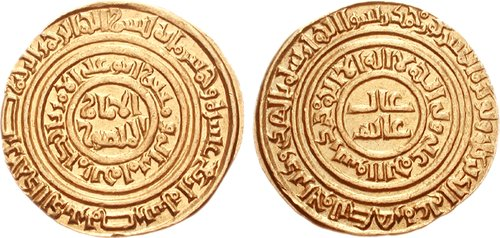
- Gold dinar of al-Amir, minted in Cairo, 514 AH (1119/20 CE)

Imam–Caliph of the Fatimid Caliphate
- Reign: 1101–1130
- Predecessor: al-Musta'li
- Successor: al-Hafiz (as caliph and Hafizi imam); al-Tayyib (as Tayyibi imam)
- Born: 31 December 1096; Cairo, Fatimid Caliphate
- Died: 7 October 1130 (aged 33); Cairo, Fatimid Caliphate
- Issue: al-Tayyib
Names
- Abū ʿAlī al-Manṣūr ibn al-Mustaʿlī
- Dynasty: Fatimid
- Father: al-Musta'li

Abu Ali al-Mansur ibn al-Musta'li (Arabic: أبو علي المنصور بن المستعلي, romanized: Abū ʿAlī al-Manṣūr ibn al-Mustaʿlī; 31 December 1096 – 7 October 1130), better known by his regnal name al-Amir bi-Ahkam Allah (Arabic: الآمر بأحكام الله, romanized: al-Āmir bi-Aḥkām Allāh, lit. 'The Ruler Who Executes God's Decrees') was the tenth Fatimid caliph, ruling from 1101 to his death in 1130, and the 20th imam of the Musta'li Isma'ili branch of Shia Islam.

Al-Amir succeeded his father, al-Musta'li, at the age of five. For the first twenty years of his reign, al-Amir was a puppet of his uncle and father-in-law, the vizier al-Afdal Shahanshah, who ruled the Fatimid state and confined al-Amir, like al-Musta'li before him, to the palace. In December 1121, al-Afdal was murdered, officially by agents of the rival Nizari branch of Isma'ilism, although some medieval accounts blame al-Amir and al-Afdal's chief secretary, al-Ma'mun al-Bata'ihi, instead. Al-Amir and al-Bata'ihi moved quickly to forestall a succession by one of al-Afdal's sons, imprisoning them and moving the vast treasures al-Afdal had amassed into the caliphal palace. Al-Bata'ihi was appointed as the new vizier, but al-Amir took an increasing role in government, and was prominently featured in spectacular public ceremonies. Finally, in 1125, al-Amir dismissed and imprisoned al-Bata'ihi, ruling thenceforth without a vizier.

Despite al-Afdal's and al-Bata'ihi's repeated military efforts against the Crusaders in Palestine, al-Amir's reign saw the progressive loss of the Fatimid coastal strongholds in the Levant apart from Ascalon. Al-Amir took care to strengthen relations with the fellow Musta'li Isma'ili Sulayhid realm of Yemen, and issued a statement of Musta'li orthodoxy, the al-Hidaya al-Amiriyya, in 1122, refuting Nizari claims to legitimacy. His assassination by Nizari agents in 1130, leaving only his infant son al-Tayyib as heir, threw the Fatimid regime into a succession struggle during which it almost collapsed. Fatimid rule was restored with the succession of al-Amir's cousin al-Hafiz li-Din Allah in 1132, which led to the division of Musta'li Isma'ilism into the rival Hafizi and Tayyibi branches.

== Life ==
The future al-Amir was born on 31 December 1096 as Mansur, the oldest son of the ninth Fatimid imam-caliph, al-Musta'li (r. 1094–1101). His mother was a sister of the all-powerful vizier, al-Afdal Shahanshah, who had raised al-Musta'li to the throne in 1094 and was the de facto ruler of the Fatimid state.

=== Reign under al-Afdal's tutelage ===
Al-Musta'li died on 11 December 1101, and on the same day, at the age of five, al-Amir was proclaimed caliph by al-Afdal. Al-Afdal was already al-Amir's maternal uncle, and further strengthened the familial ties with the young caliph by marrying him to his own daughter. This was a departure from usual practice, as the Fatimid caliphs had until then had children with concubines and never legally wed. The formal marriage was evidently an attempt by al-Afdal to secure the succession of any progeny of this union over other children of the caliph. A decree, dictated by al-Afdal, renewed his appointment as vizier with plenipotentiary powers and ensured his ascendancy over the child-caliph. The first twenty years of al-Amir's reign were thus dominated by al-Afdal, who controlled government and restricted al-Amir to a few ceremonial duties. Like his father before him, al-Amir lived mostly confined in the caliphal palaces, while al-Afdal arrogated most ceremonial functions to himself.

Under al-Afdal's rule, the Fatimid state was chiefly occupied with the conflict with the Crusaders of the Kingdom of Jerusalem. This holy war also served as the main legitimisation device for al-Afdal's rule and for the dynasty itself. During the previous decade, both the Fatimid state (the dawla) and the Fatimid Isma'ili mission (the da'wa) had suffered setbacks: much of the Levant had been lost to the Sunni Seljuk Turks, while al-Afdal's coup that installed al-Musta'li on the throne resulted in the breaking away of the Nizari Isma'ilis from Fatimid allegiance. As the historian Michael Brett writes, the struggle against the Crusaders "had given the dynasty fresh purpose". Despite al-Afdal's continuous campaigns, most of Palestine was lost to the Crusaders, along with the Levantine coastal cities of Tartus (1102), Acre (1104), Tripoli (1109), and Sidon (1111). Egypt itself was briefly invaded by King Baldwin I of Jerusalem in 1117. The Fatimids largely fell back on the coastal city of Ascalon, which developed into a major fortress and outpost (ribat) of the holy war: for the next half-century it was to remain a centre for raids against the Crusader territories, and a guard of the route from Palestine into Egypt. Medieval Muslim historians often blame al-Amir for these disasters, but in reality he played no role in the Fatimid government during those years; the caliph was confined to the palace and public ceremonies, while al-Afdal ruled almost as a sultan via his own secretaries, first Mukhtar Taj al-Ma'ali and then al-Qa'id al-Bata'ihi. In 1115, the increasingly ill and feeble al-Afdal appointed his own son, Sama' al-Mulk Husayn, as his deputy and heir-presumptive, but after a failed assassination attempt in 1118 the vizier withdrew all privileges from his sons, whom he suspected of being involved, thus ending the prospect of a dynastic succession.

=== Assassination of al-Afdal ===
Al-Afdal's tutelage ended with his assassination on 11 December 1121, on the eve of the Eid al-Fitr. The deed was officially blamed on Nizari agents, (Note: A list of Nizari assassination victims from Alamut also claims responsibility for al-Afdal's death.) but both medieval historians (Note: The contemporary Syrian chronicler Ibn al-Qalanisi directly accuses al-Amir, while the 15th-century historian Ibn Taghribirdi claims that al-Amir ordered the assassination in response to al-Afdal attempting to poison him.) and modern scholars are skeptical: given his own resentment at the subordinate figurehead role to which al-Afdal had relegated him, al-Amir is suspected of having been the true instigator of the assassination.

While engaging in a public display of grief for his vizier and father-in-law and arranging a public burial ceremony in the caliphal palace, al-Amir moved quickly to imprison al-Afdal's sons and confiscate al-Afdal's enormous fortune, houses, and estates, while the moveable items were brought from the vizieral palace to his own palace. During their long rule over Egypt as quasi-sultans, al-Afdal and his father, Badr al-Jamali, had accumulated an enormous treasure, "the extent of which no one knew apart from God", according to the 13th-century encyclopaedist Ibn Khallikan. It was considered to have been larger than that of any previous king, and it took forty days to move it.

=== Vizierate of al-Ma'mun al-Bata'ihi ===
As al-Amir had been left out of government and was unfamiliar with its intricacies, he selected al-Afdal's long-time chief of staff, al-Qa'id al-Bata'ihi, as vizier. The sources that blame al-Amir for al-Afdal's murder also implicate the ambitious al-Bata'ihi in the deed, or at least in concealing al-Afdal's death until al-Amir could arrive at the vizieral palace to designate al-Bata'ihi as al-Afdal's successor. After supervising the transfer of al-Afdal's treasures, al-Bata'ihi was formally proclaimed vizier on 13 February 1122, and given the honorific al-Ma'mun ('the trusted one'), by which he is known.

Al-Bata'ihi formally assumed the same plenipotentiary powers that al-Afdal had possessed, and was a capable administrator, but his position was much weaker vis-à-vis the caliph than his old master's: al-Amir resumed many of the old caliphal ceremonial functions that al-Afdal had arrogated to himself, and he henceforth had a voice in government. As historian Michael Brett writes, "The relationship itself was one of alliance, in which the minister was entrusted as before with the responsibilities of government, in return for bringing the monarch out from his seclusion into the public eye". Most importantly, al-Amir ensured that all tax income and precious textiles would be kept in the caliphal palace, and distributed from there. As ruler, al-Amir is portrayed in the sources as "unusually intelligent and knowledgeable", and was said to have memorised the Quran. The changed balance of power was apparent to al-Bata'ihi, who sought to secure his position by extracting a written pledge from al-Amir to communicate any denunciations or accusations directly to him. The document was to be valid until al-Bata'ihi's death, and the caliph furthermore undertook to look after the vizier's offspring after that.

In the aftermath of the assassination of al-Afdal, the threat of the Nizaris, who were implacably hostile to the rule of al-Amir and his father, was a major concern of the government, in view of the widespread network of agents they had established. Reports received in Cairo claimed that the chief Nizari leader, Hasan-i Sabbah, celebrated al-Afdal's murder and awaited the same fate for al-Amir and al-Bata'ihi. A hunt for Nizari agents was launched by the vizier, who established an extensive espionage network of his own to counter Nizati infiltration of Cairo. In addition, in December 1122 al-Amir convened a meeting of officials in Cairo in which the Nizari claims to the Nizar's being the rightful successor of Caliph al-Mustansir (r. 1036–1094) were publicly denounced, and the legitimacy of al-Musta'li's succession affirmed, by none other than a person presented as Nizar's only sister. A proclamation to that effect, the al-Hidaya al-Amiriyya, was issued on this occasion, publicly read from the pulpits of the mosques, and then sent to the Nizari communities in Persia.

In spring 1122, the Fatimid fleet managed to recover control of the Levantine port city of Tyre from its Turkish governor, appointed by Toghtekin, the Sunni Turkish ruler of Damascus. This triumph was short-lived, as a Venetian fleet under Doge Domenico Michiel attived to support the Crusader states of the Levant shortly after. While early Venetian raids on the Nile Delta were defeated, in 1123 the Venetians defeated the Fatimid fleet off Ascalon, and the Fatimid army sent to capture Jaffa was routed by the Crusaders at the Battle of Yibneh. With Tyre now again cut off and in danger of falling to the Crusaders, the Fatimids had to accept renewed Turkish control; left unsupported, the city capitulated to the Kingdom of Jerusalem in July 1124. In 1123, the Luwata Berbers invaded Egypt and reached as far as Alexandria, before they were driven back and forced to pay tribute. In the same year, the Zirid emir of Ifriqiya, Abu'l-Hasan al-Hasan ibn Ali, also sent envoys to Cairo to announce his return to recognising Fatimid suzerainty, and sought Fatimid assistance in repelling a possible Norman invasion.

Al-Amir also paid attention to courting the remaining pro-Fatimid, Musta'li Isma'ili communities abroad, especially in Yemen, led by the Sulayhid queen Arwa. Al-Afdal had sent an envoy, Ali ibn Ibrahim ibn Najib al-Dawla, in 1119 to bring the Yemeni Isma'ilis into closer alignment with Cairo; after al-Afdal's death, the Fatimid engagement in Yemen intensified further, with the dispatch of military forces. This allowed Ibn Najib al-Dawla to pursue his own policies regardless of Queen Arwa, but he was heavily defeated while attempting to capture Zabid in 1124, with most of his Fatimid-supplied troops perishing. His independent activities and arrogant manner met with suspicion and then resistance from the Yemeni chieftains, who began to conspire against him and warned Cairo that he was engaged in Nizari propaganda; fake coins with the name of Nizar ibn al-Mustansir were even produced for the purpose. Another military detachment was sent to Yemen in late 1125 (after al-Bata'ihi's downfall) and brought back the disgraced envoy in chains. After public humiliation through the streets of Cairo, Ibn Najib al-Dawla was thrown in prison.

=== Personal rule ===
Political map of the Levant in c. 1135

On 3 October 1125 al-Amir suddenly ordered al-Bata'ihi, his brother Haydara al-Mu'taman, and his chief aides arrested. Various reasons were put forward for this: that al-Amir did not forgive al-Bata'ihi the loss of Tyre; that the secretary Ibn Abi Usama convinced al-Amir that the vizier conspired with Ja'far, al-Amir's only full brother, to depose him; or that al-Bata'ihi was the true instigator of the fake Nizari coinage struck in Yemen. The truth is rather that al-Amir, like other caliphs in the past, had begun resenting the power of his over-mighty vizier. The vizier was also a victim of his own policies: unlike Badr and al-Afdal, al-Bata'ihi lacked a power base of his own in the army, and relied on the caliph as his patron; and the revival of al-Amir's public role, lavishly orchestrated by al-Bata'ihi himself, only served to strengthen the caliph's authority and self-confidence. Finally, the pledge extracted by al-Bata'ihi from the caliph, intended to safeguard him, may have backfired, as al-Amir perceived it as a personal humiliation. Haydara died in prison, but al-Bata'ihi was executed along with Ibn Najib al-Dawla on the night of 19/20 July 1128.

Al-Amir did not appoint a new vizier, becoming the first Fatimid caliph since al-Hakim (r. 996–1021) to personally lead the government, while relying on the heads of the various administrative departments for professional expertise. This was partly due to the lack of suitable candidates; the chief qadi, Abu'l-Hajjaj, refused to take on the job of supervising the departments citing his lack of experience in such matters. Soon, one of the department heads, the former Coptic Christian monk Ibn Qusa, rose to prominence due to his ability to provide the caliph with money through confiscations from Christians, Jews, and eventually Muslims as well, which caused much resentment among the latter. His ascendancy lasted for three years, from October/November 1126 to 1129, and he was awarded grand titles such as 'Holy Father', 'Lord of the [Coptic] Patriarchate', 'Father of Fathers', and even 'Thirteenth Apostle'. His end came when his exactions extended to the court eunuchs, who informed al-Amir of popular discontent, and that an uprising was brewing if nothing was done. Thereupon Ibn Qusa was arrested and beaten to death with shoes; his corpse was nailed to a plank and thrown into the Nile. Having ignored the matter for so long, al-Amir's own reputation was left tarnished from the affair, as well as from his extravagance and profligacy: it is said that the palace consumed 5,000 sheep per month, and the rich gifts he made to his favourites were remarked upon. The caliph saw himself obliged to make public gestures of contrition by freeing slaves, giving alms, and, on the advice of his jurists, extending the Ramadan fast by two months.

In February/March 1130, al-Amir finally had a son, who was named al-Tayyib. His birth was celebrated with public festivals, and letters were sent abroad announcing his birth, and his designation as successor.

=== Murder and aftermath ===
The rival lines of succession of the Isma'ili imams resulting from the Musta'li–Nizari and Hafizi–Tayyibi schisms. Al-Amir was the last ruler from his line.

On 7 October 1130, al-Amir was assassinated by Nizari agents. He left only his six-month-old son, al-Tayyib, to succeed him, with no designated regent or serving vizier. Al-Amir's murder not only undid his attempts to once again concentrate power in the caliph's hands instead of over-mighty generals and ministers, but also, given the fragility of succession, endangered the very survival of the Fatimid dynasty.

Al-Tayyib was quickly sidelined, and his fate is unknown; modern historians speculate that he died in infancy or was killed. A new regime was installed under the regency of al-Amir's cousin, Abd al-Majid, which at first claimed to rule in the name of an unborn son by one of al-Amir's concubines. Within a fortnight, an army mutiny brought al-Afdal's last surviving son, Kutayfat, to power. Kutayfat abolished the Fatimid imamate and imprisoned Abd al-Majid, but was himself assassinated by Fatimid loyalists in December 1131. With no other heir available, Abd al-Majid took over as imam and caliph with the regnal name al-Hafiz li-Din Allah in January 1132, proclaiming that he had secretly received the designation by al-Amir before he had died.

Al-Hafiz' succession broke a continuous line of father-to-son succession of ten generations, something extremely rare in the Islamic world and much remarked upon by medieval authors. Al-Hafiz' accession thus represented an unprecedented departure from the accepted norm, and caused yet another schism in Isma'ilism, as the Musta'li sect was divided into those who accepted al-Hafiz's succession (the "Hafizis") and those who did not, upholding instead the imamate of the vanished al-Tayyib (the "Tayyibis"). The Hafizis were mostly concentrated in the Fatimid-controlled territories in Egypt, Nubia, and the Levant, while the Tayyibis resided in the Yemen, where Queen Arwa took up a leading role in forming a separate Tayyibi da'wa that survives to the present day.

The Tayyibis hold that al-Tayyib was entrusted by al-Amir to a certain Ibn Madyan, and that Ibn Madyan and his helpers hid the infant when Kutayfat came to power. Ibn Madyan was killed by Kutayfat, but his brother-in-law escaped with al-Tayyib, who went into concealment. Al-Tayyib is held to have died while still in concealment, and his offspring have continued as hidden imams to the present day. The public leadership of the Tayyibi community was instead assumed by a succession of 'absolute missionaries' (da'i al-mutlaq).

The Musta'li–Nizari and Hafizi–Tayyibi schisms in the lines of succession of the Isma'ili imamate

al-Mustansir bi'llah (r. 1036–1094)
Abu'l-Qasim Muhammad	al-Musta'li bi'llah (r. 1094–1101)	Abu Mansur Nizar
al-Hafiz li-Din Allah (r. 1132–1149)	al-Amir bi-Ahkam Allah (r. 1101–1130)
al-Tayyib
Hafizi imam-caliphs	Tayyibi hidden imams	Nizari imams

denotes ruling Fatimid caliphs (with regnal dates)
Source: Daftary, Farhad (2007). The Ismāʿı̄lı̄s: Their History and Doctrines (Second ed.). Cambridge: Cambridge University Press. p. 508. ISBN 978-0-521-61636-2.

== See also ==
- List of Ismaili imams
- Lists of rulers of Egypt

== Sources ==
- Behrens-Abouseif, Doris (1992). "The Façade of the Aqmar Mosque in the Context of Fatimid Ceremonial". Muqarnas. 9: 29–38. doi:10.2307/1523133. JSTOR 1523133.
- Brett, Michael (2017). The Fatimid Empire. The Edinburgh History of the Islamic Empires. Edinburgh: Edinburgh University Press. ISBN 978-0-7486-4076-8.
- Daftary, Farhad (2007). The Ismāʿı̄lı̄s: Their History and Doctrines (Second ed.). Cambridge: Cambridge University Press. ISBN 978-0-521-61636-2.
- Halm, Heinz (2014). Kalifen und Assassinen: Ägypten und der vordere Orient zur Zeit der ersten Kreuzzüge, 1074–1171 [Caliphs and Assassins: Egypt and the Near East at the Time of the First Crusades, 1074–1171] (in German). Munich: C. H. Beck. doi:10.17104/9783406661648-1. ISBN 978-3-406-66163-1.
- Sajjadi, Sadeq (2015). "Al-Āmir bi-Aḥkām Allāh". In Madelung, Wilferd; Daftary, Farhad (eds.). Encyclopaedia Islamica. Translated by Farzin Negahban. Brill. doi:10.1163/1875-9831_isla_SIM_0269.
- Stern, S. M. (1951). "The Succession to the Fatimid Imam al-Āmir, the Claims of the Later Fatimids to the Imamate, and the Rise of Ṭayyibī Ismailism". Oriens. 4 (2): 193–255. doi:10.2307/1579511. JSTOR 1579511.
- Stern, S. M. (1960). "al-Āmir". In Gibb, H. A. R.; Kramers, J. H.; Lévi-Provençal, E.; Schacht, J.; Lewis, B. & Pellat, Ch. (eds.). The Encyclopaedia of Islam, Second Edition. Volume I: A–B. Leiden: E. J. Brill. p. 440. doi:10.1163/1573-3912_islam_SIM_0603. OCLC 495469456.
- Walker, Paul E. (2011). "al-Āmir bi-Aḥkām Allāh". In Fleet, Kate; Krämer, Gudrun; Matringe, Denis; Nawas, John; Rowson, Everett (eds.). Encyclopaedia of Islam (3rd ed.). Brill Online. doi:10.1163/1573-3912_ei3_COM_23060. ISSN 1873-9830.

al-Amir bi-Ahkam Allah Fatimid dynasty Born: 31 December 1096 Died: 7 October 1130
Regnal titles
Preceded by al-Musta'li Billah	Fatimid Caliph; 12 December 1101 – 7 October 1130	Vacant Regency of Abd al-Majid. Temporary abolition of the Fatimid regime by Kutayfat. Title next held by al-Hafiz li-Din Allah
Shia Islam titles
Preceded by al-Musta'li Billah	Imam of Musta'li Isma'ilism; 12 December 1101 – 7 October 1130	Succeeded by al-Hafiz li-Din Allah as Imam of Hafizi Isma'ilism
Preceded by al-Musta'li Billah	Imam of Musta'li Isma'ilism; 12 December 1101 – 7 October 1130	Succeeded by al-Tayyib Abu al-Qasim as Imam of Tayyibi Isma'ilism
