= Hassan II of Alamut =

23rd Ismaili Nizari Imam

Hasan 'Ala Zikrihi's-Salam
- حسن على ذكره السلام
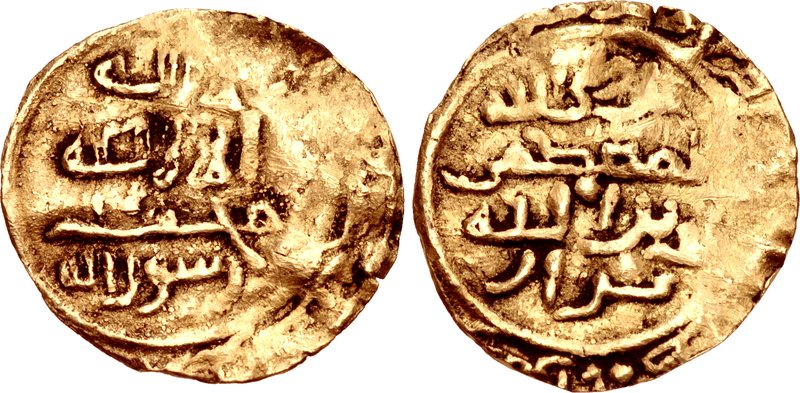
- Born: 1142/1145 AD; Alamut Castle
- Died: 1166 AD
- Resting place: Lambsar Castle
- Other names: Malik'es-Selâm (Lord of Peace), Malik'ûl-Kulûb (Lord of Hearts)
- Term: 1164–1166
- Predecessor: Hasan al-Qahir
- Successor: Nūr al-Dīn Muhammad

Ḥasan ʿAlā Zikrihi's-Salām (Persian: حسن على ذكره السلام) or Hassan II was the hereditary Imam of the Nizari Isma'ilis of the Alamut Period from 1162 until 1166. From his capital of Alamut he ruled parts of Persia and Syria. His chief subordinate in Syria was Rashid ad-Din Sinan, the Old Man of the Mountain.

== Biography ==
=== Controversy over descent ===
There are conflicting reports of Hassan's origin. One of the only historical reference extant, Juwayni (who was hostile to Ismailis), claims that Hassan was the son of Muhammad ibn Buzurg-Ummid, Fatimid dai and lord of Alamut. According to Juwayni's reports, Hassan first implicitly claimed the imamate and then claimed to be the caliph himself. However, Nizari sources generally claim an Alid descent for Hassan, and believe that Hassan ibn Muhammad ibn Buzurg-Ummid is distinct from Hassan II of Alamut.

=== Leadership ===
In 1164 Hassan, leading the Nizari sect of Ismaili, proclaimed the Qiyamat, the abrogation of Sharia law. The concept of Qiyamah in exoteric Islam means the End of the World and the Day of Judgment. But in the esoteric interpretations of Ismaili Islam, Qiyamah is the beginning of an era of spiritual renaissance where the spiritual dimensions of Islam will be practiced openly, spiritual truths will become widely known, and certain ritualistic aspects of Islam will be abrogated. Fatimid Ismaili texts from the 10th-11th century describe the anticipated arrival of the Qiyamah era by a future Fatimid Ismaili Imam. These expectations were fulfilled by the declaration of Qiyamah by Imam Hasan.

=== Declaration of the Qiyama ===
Only two years after his accession, the Imām Hasan ‘Alā Zikrihi's Salām conducted a ceremony known as qiyama (resurrection) at the grounds of the Alamut Castle, whereby the Imām would once again become visible to his community of followers in and outside of the Nizārī Ismā'īlī state. Given Juwayni's polemical aims, and the fact that he burned the Ismā'īlī libraries which may have offered much more reliable testimony about the history, scholars have been dubious about his narrative but are forced to rely on it given the absence of alternative sources. Fortunately, descriptions of this event are also preserved in Rashid al-Din’s narrative and recounted in the Haft Bab Baba-yi Sayyidna, written 60 years after the event, and the later Haft Bab-i Abi Ishaq, an Ismaili book of the 15th century AD. However, Rashid al-Din's narrative is based on Juwayni, and the Nizari sources do not go into specific details. Since very few contemporary Nizari Ismaili accounts of the events has survived, and it is likely that scholars will never know the exact details of this event. However, there was no total abrogation of all law – only certain exoteric rituals like the Salah/Namaz, Fasting in Ramadan, Hajj to Makkah and facing Makkah in prayer were abrogated; however the Nizaris continued to perform rituals of worship, except these rituals were more esoteric and spiritually oriented. For example, the true prayer is to remember God at every moment; the true fasting is to keep all of the body's organs away from whatever is unethical and forbidden. Ethical conduct is enjoined at all times.

=== Death ===
The Imām Hasan died a violent death in 1166, only a year and a half after the declaration of the qiyama. According to Juwayni, he was stabbed in the Ismaili castle of Lambsar by his brother-in-law, Hasan Namwar. He was succeeded by his son Imām Nūr al-Dīn Muhammad, who refined and explained Hasan's doctrine of qiyamah in greater detail.

== See also ==
- Alamut Castle
- Order of Assassins
- Ata al-Mulk Juvayni
- Tārīkh-i Jahāngushāy
- Crusades
- History of Nizari Ismailism

Ḥasan ʿAlā Zikrihi's-Salām Banu Hashim Clan of the Banu Quraish Born: 1142/1145 C.E Died: 1166 C.E.
Regnal titles
Preceded by Muhammad Buzurg Ummid as da'i)	4th ruler of the Nizari Ismaili state and commander of Alamut Castle; 1164–1166	Succeeded by Nur al-Din Muhammad II
Shia Islam titles
Preceded by Hasan (I) al-Qahir (in concealment)	23rd Imam of Nizari Isma'ilism; 1164–1166	Succeeded by Nur al-Din Muhammad II
