= Al-Mustansir Billah =

Fatimid caliph from 1036 to 1094/95

al-Mustansir Billah المستنصر بالله
- Caliph; Amir al-Mu'minīn
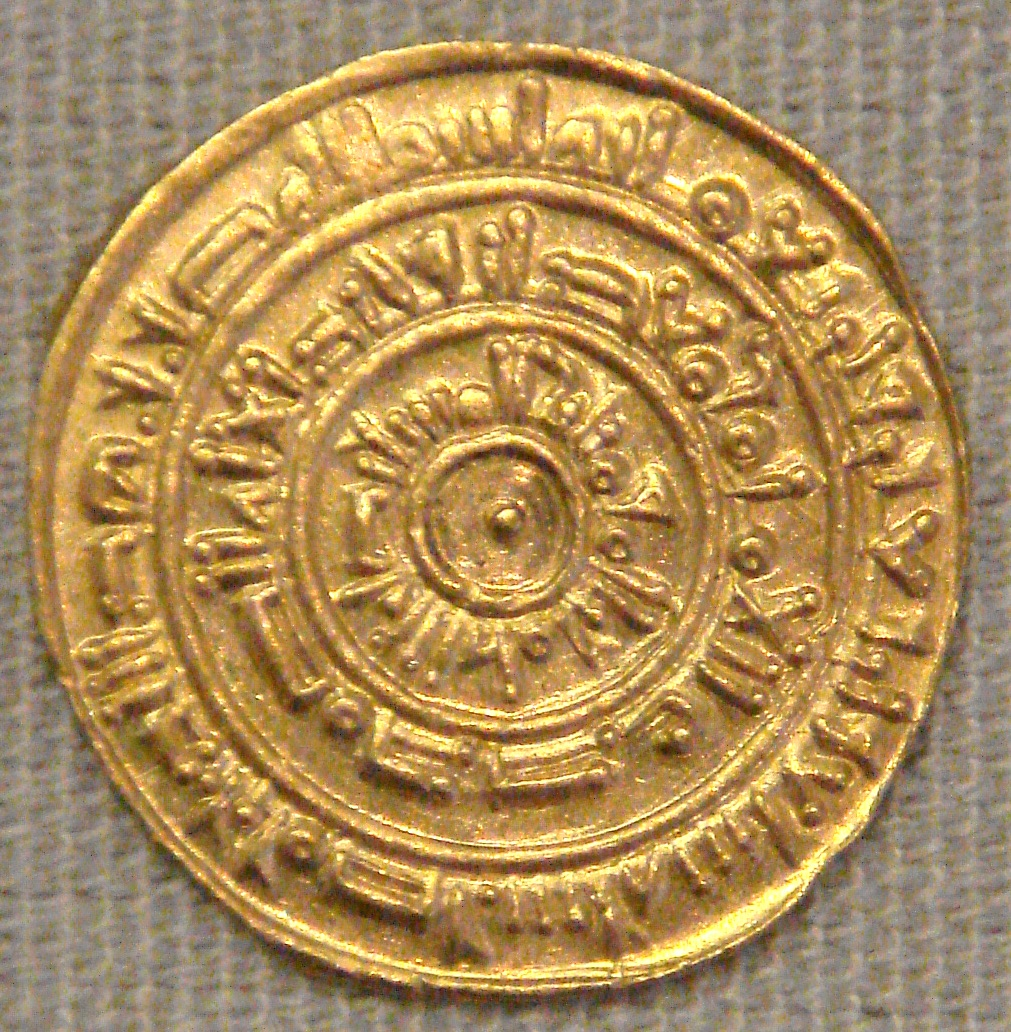
- Gold coin of al-Mustansir, Egypt, 1055 CE.

8th Imam–Caliph of the Fatimid Caliphate
- Reign: 13 June 1036 (15 Sha'ban 427 AH) (Note: While the year 1035 is cited by some historians as the year in which he ascended the throne, the year 1036 is cited more frequently, particularly by Muslim scholars.) – 29 December 1094 (18 Dhu'l-Hijja 487 AH) (Note: His death date, when converted to the Western calendar, is sometime given as 6 January 1095, but 29 December is the date commonly used.)
- Predecessor: az-Zahir
- Successor: al-Musta'li
- Born: 2 July 1029 (16 Jumada II 420 AH); Cairo, Fatimid Egypt
- Died: 29 December 1094 (18 Dhu'l-Hijja 487 AH) (aged 65); Fatimid Egypt
- Issue: al-Musta'li; Nizar; Abu'l-Qasim Muhammad (father of al-Hafiz)
- Dynasty: Fatimid
- Father: az-Zahir
- Mother: Rasad
- Religion: Ismaili Shia Islam

Abū Tamīm Maʿad al-Mustanṣir bi'llāh (Arabic: أبو تميم معد المستنصر بالله; 2 July 1029 – 29 December 1094) was the eighth Fatimid Caliph from 1036 until 1094. He was one of the longest reigning Muslim rulers. His reign was the twilight of the Fatimid state. The start of his reign saw the continuation of competent administrators running the Fatimid state (Anushtakin, al-Jarjara'i, and later al-Yazuri), overseeing the state's prosperity in the first two decades of al-Mustansir's reign. However, the break out of court infighting between the Turkish and Berber/Sudanese court factions following al-Yazuri's assassination, coinciding with natural disasters in Egypt and the gradual loss of administrative control over Fatimid possessions outside of Egypt, almost resulted in the total collapse of the Fatimid state in the 1060s, before the appointment of the Armenian general Badr al-Jamali, who assumed power as vizier in 1073, and became the de facto dictator of the country under the nominal rule of al-Mustansir.

The caliph al-Mustanṣir bi-llāh was the last Imam before a disastrous split divided the Isma'ili movement in two, due to the struggle in the succession between al-Mustansir's older son, Nizar, and the younger al-Mustaʽli, who was raised to the throne by Badr's son and successor, al-Afdal Shahanshah. The followers of Nizar, who predominated in Iran and Syria, became the Nizari branch of Isma'ilism, while those of al-Musta'li became the Musta'li branch.

== Biography ==
Al-Mustansir was born in Cairo on 16 Jumada II 420 AH / 2 July 1029, to Ali az-Zahir and Rasad, a black slave from Nubia. At the age of only eight months he was declared the heir of his father. His name was Abu Tamim Maʿad, surnamed al-Mustansir Bi'llah ("The Asker of Victory from God"). He ascended to the Fatimid Caliphate's throne on 15 Sha'ban 427 / 13 June 1036 at the age of 7. During the early years of his Caliphate, state affairs were administered by his mother. His rule lasted for 60 years, the longest of all the caliphs, either in Egypt or elsewhere in Islamic states. However, Fatimid power was confined to Egypt due to conquests of the Seljuks in the Levant, Normans in Sicily and Malta, and by Arab tribes destabilizing Fatimid control over Tunisia and Tripoli. Al-Mustansir was considered incapable and as such his court was dominated by military strongmen and his mother's favourite officials, while the treasury was exhausted by factional infighting.

He had constructed a special mihrab at one of the pillars in the Mosque of Ibn Tulun. Atop the mihrab, his name is engraved along with the Shahada commonly recited by the public in the Fatimid era ending with the phrase 'Ali-un Wali-u Allah, meaning "Ali is the steward of God".

=== His Court ===
Prominent Dais/Vizirs of his era are as follows:

- Ali bin Ahmad Jarjarai, vizier (d. 1045)
- Badr al-Jamali, vizier (d. 1094)
- Mu'ayyad fi'l-Din al-Shirazi, chief missionary (dā‘i al-dū‘at) from 1059 to 1078

Moulai Abadullah and Syedi Nuruddin were two Indians who visited al-Mustansir Billah in Egypt. They joined the Ismaili faith under Fatimid Dai Mu'ayyad fi'l-Din al-Shirazi, and went to India to propagate the faith.

=== Ismaili da'wa under him ===
During the reign of the Imam al-Mustanṣir, the Ismaili da'wa (“ministry”) was led, in the eastern regions, by Abd al-Malik ibn Attash, who was based in Iṣfahān. He also enjoyed good relations with the Druze community which were persecuted by the two previous Fatimid caliphs as they were seen as a heretical offshoot of Ismailism.

Ibn al-Athīr (a Sunni historian) describes Abd al-Malik (Ibn Attash) as being interested in works of literature, and being a professional calligrapher. He continues by describing him as a clever, intelligent and quick thinker, and an ethical man.

One of Ibn Attash's most notable students, Ḥasan-i Ṣabbāḥ became an important figure and was selected as the ḥujja or “proof” of al-Mustanṣir. This position/rank was right below the Imam in the Ismaili religious hierarchy. He would go on to found the Nizari sect.

=== Construction projects ===
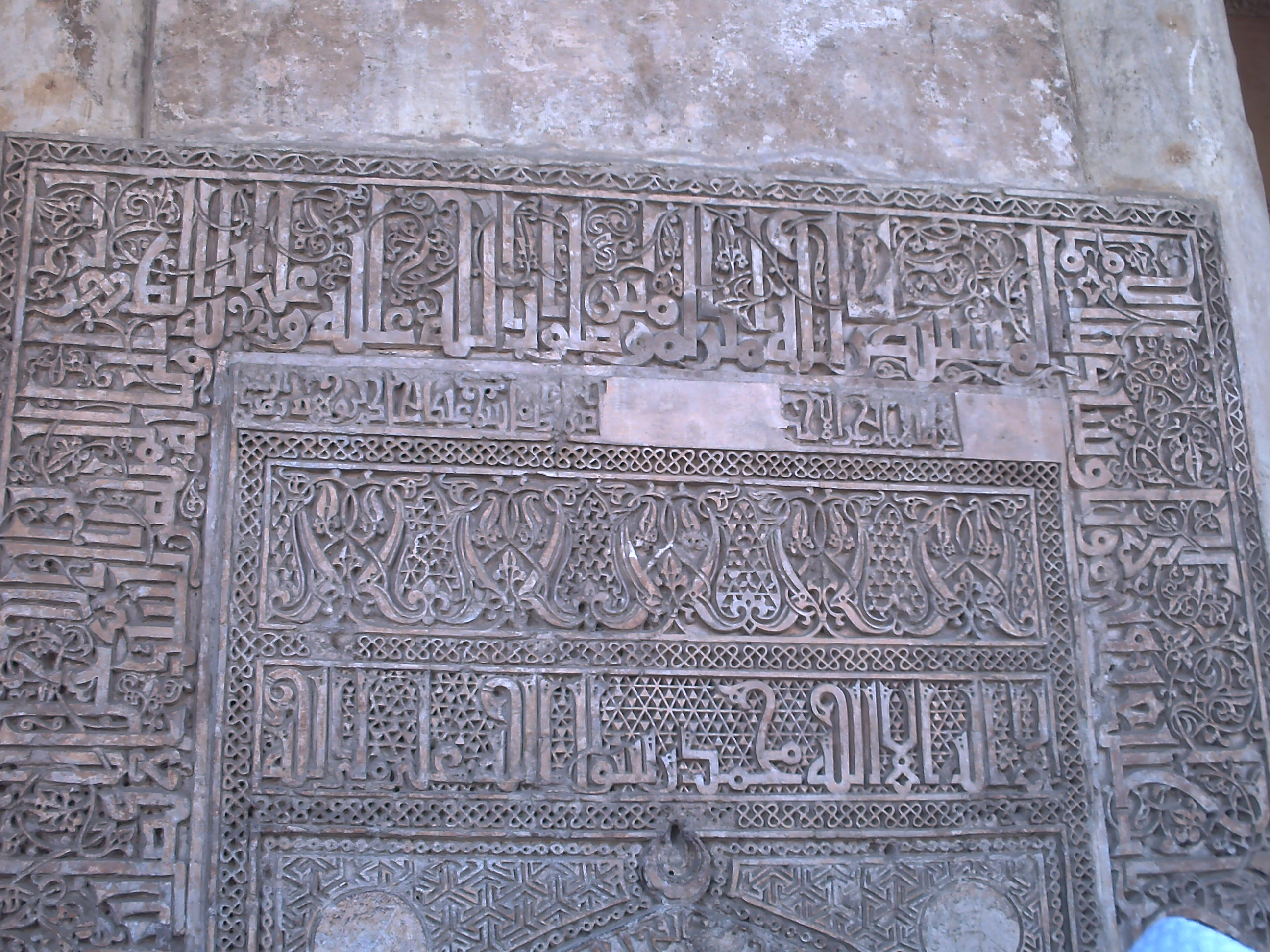
The mihrab made in honour of al-Mustansir Billah in the Mosque of Ibn Tulun with the phrase ʿalī-un-walī-u-allāh at the end, Cairo.

Prominent buildings constructed during the reign of al-Mustansir are as follows:

- Bab al-Futuh
- Bab al-Nasr
- Bab Zuweila
- Juyushi Mosque

== Famine ==
Between 1065 (457 AH) and 1072 (464 AH), famine degraded the conditions in Egypt from bad to worse. Meanwhile, in 1062 (454 AH) and again in 1067 (459 AH), the struggle between the Turkish and Sudanese soldiery deteriorated into open warfare, ending in a victory for the Turks.

During this same period, Berber nomadic tribes from lower Egypt deliberately aggravated the distress by ravaging the countryside, destroying the embankments and canals of the Nile. The ten thousand animals that al-Mustansir's stables once held reportedly declined to the point where only three thin horses were left; it is said that eventually al-Mustansir alone possessed a horse, and that when he rode out, the courtiers followed on foot, having no beast to carry them; it is also said that his escort once fainted from hunger as it accompanied him through the streets. As long as the calamity lasted, the condition of the country continued to decline. The protracted famine was followed inevitably by plague; whole districts were absolutely denuded of population and house after house lay empty.

== Turkic mercenaries ==
Concurrently, the Turkish mercenaries had drained the treasury; many of the works of art and valuables of all sorts in the palace were sold to satisfy their demands---often they themselves were the purchasers, at merely nominal prices, and resold the articles thus gained at a profit. Emeralds valued at 300,000 dinars were bought by one Turkish general for 500 dinars, and in one fortnight of the year 460/1068 articles to the value of 30,000,000 dinars were sold off to provide pay for the Turks. The precious library, which had been rendered available to the public and was one of the attractions for many who visited Cairo, was scattered; the books were torn up, thrown away, or used to light fires. At length, the Turks began fighting amongst themselves. Nasir al-Dawla ibn Hamdan, the general of the Turks, had invested the city, which was defended by the rival faction of the Turkish guard; after burning part of Fustat and defeating the defenders, he entered as conqueror. When he reached the palace, he found al-Mustansir lodged in rooms which had been stripped bare, waited on by only three slaves, and subsisting on two loaves which were sent him daily by the daughters of Ibn Babshand, the grammarian.

The victorious Turks dominated Cairo, held the successive viziers in subjection, treated al-Mustansir with contempt, and used their power to deplete the treasury by enhancing their pay to nearly twenty times its former figure. Nasir al-Dawla became so overbearing and tyrannical in his conduct that he provoked even his own followers, and so at length he was assassinated in 466/1074. Unfortunately, this left the city in a worse condition than ever, for it was now at the mercy of the various Turkish factions, who behaved no better than brigands. Conditions in Egypt continued to deteriorate, and unabated violence raged in the streets and countryside alike.

== Descendants ==
Using the genealogical information of the members of the Fatimid dynasty imprisoned by Saladin, and contemporary documents, the historian Paul E. Walker estimates that al-Mustansir had "at the minimum seventeen sons whose names we can recover". Indeed, he suggests that it was precisely the great number of offspring he sired during his long reign that created the succession crisis after his death.

Family tree of the Fatimid dynasty

Abu Muhammad Abdallah **al-Mahdi bi'llah** (r. 909–934)
Abu'l-Qasim Muhammad **al-Qa'im bi-Amr Allah** (r. 934–946)	Abu Ali Ahmad	Other children
al-Qasim^{§}	Abu Tahir Isma'il **al-Mansur bi'llah** (r. 946–953)	Other children
Abu Tamim Ma'ad **al-Mu'izz li-Din Allah** (r. 953–975)	Abd al-Rahim^{§}
Tamim	Abdallah^{§}	Abu Mansur Nizar **al-Aziz bi'llah** (r. 975–996)	Other children
Amina	Abu Ali Mansur **al-Hakim bi-Amr Allah** (r. 996–1021)	Sitt al-Mulk	Other children
Abu'l-Hasan Ali **al-Zahir li-I'zaz Din Allah** (r. 1021–1036)
Abu Tamim Ma'ad **al-Mustansir bi'llah** (r. 1036–1094)
Abu Mansur Nizar^{§} (elder son)	Abu Abdallah	Abdallah	Isma'il	Abu'l-Qasim Muhammad	Other children	Abu'l-Qasim Ahmad **al-Musta'li bi'llah** (r. 1094–1101)
al-Husayn	Nizari imams (claimed descent)	Abu'l-Maymun Abd al-Majid **al-Hafiz li-Din Allah** (r. 1132–1149)	Abu Ali Mansur **al-Amir bi-Ahkam Allah** (r. 1101–1130)	Ja'far	Other children
Sulayman^{§}	Haydara^{§}	Hasan^{§}	Abu Mansur Isma'il **al-Zafir bi-Amr Allah** (r. 1149–1154)	Yusuf	Other children	Abu'l-Qasim al-Tayyib^{§}
Abu'l-Qasim Isa **al-Fa'iz bi-Nasr Allah** (r. 1154–1160)	Abu Muhammad Abdallah **al-Adid li-Din Allah** (r. 1160–1171)	Tayyibi hidden imams (claimed descent)
Dawud
Sulayman

^{§} denotes designated heirs who did not accede to the throne
denotes ruling Fatimid caliphs (with regnal names in **bold** and regnal dates)

== Gallery ==
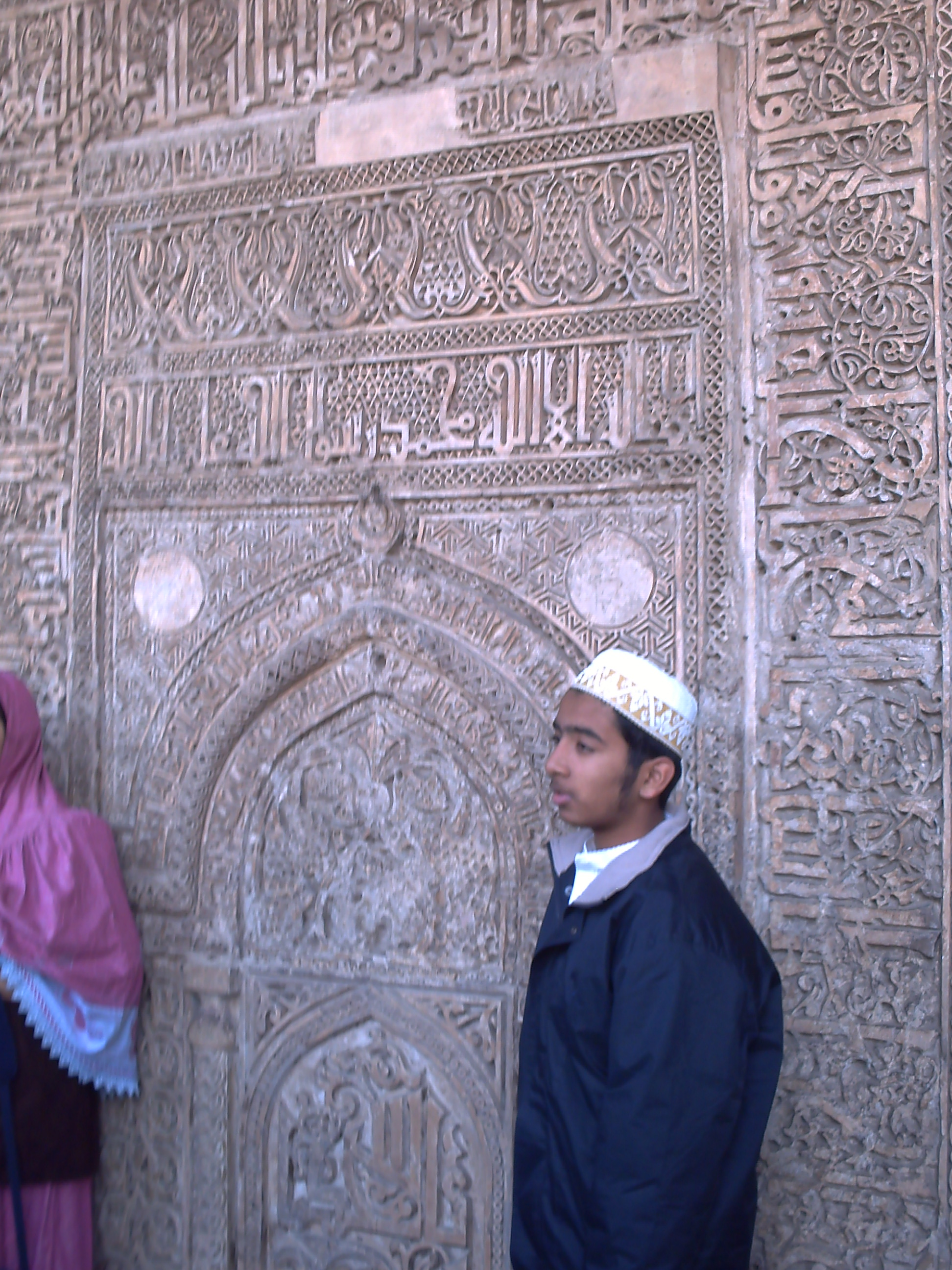
al-Mustansir's mihrab at the Ibn Tulun mosque, Cairo

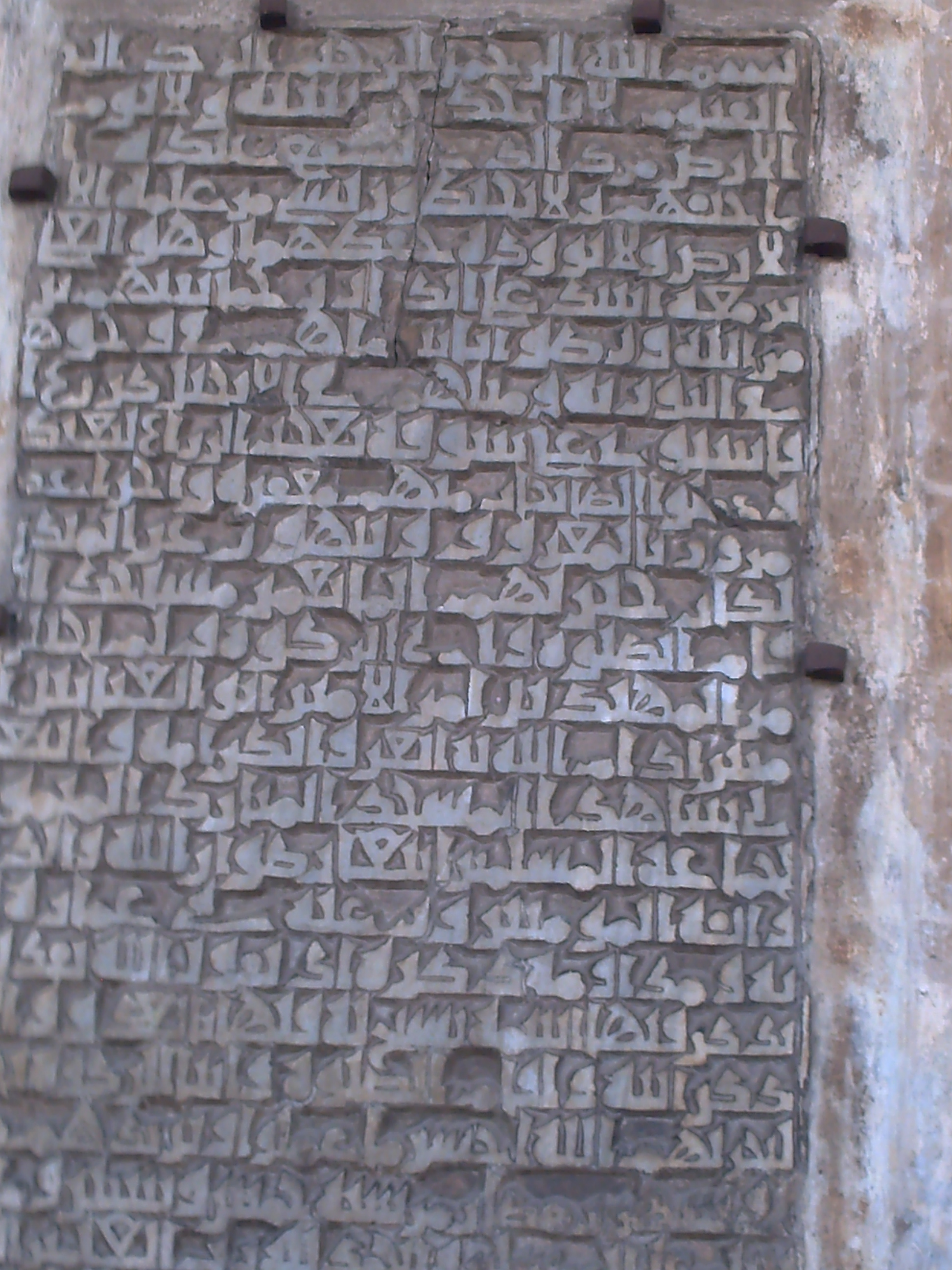
Stone inscription from al-Mustansir's time near al-Mustansir's mihrab

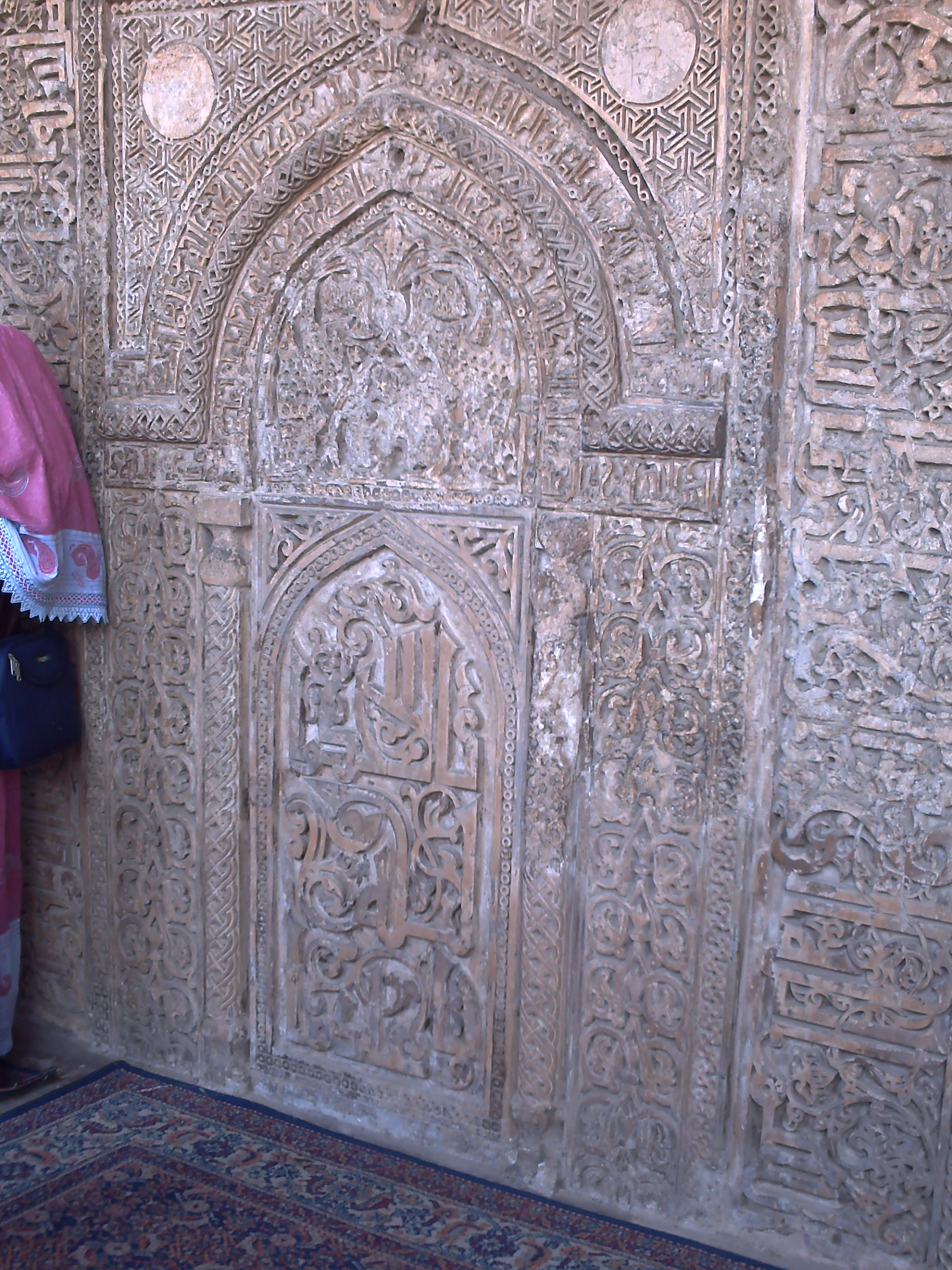
Detail of al-Mustansir's mihrab

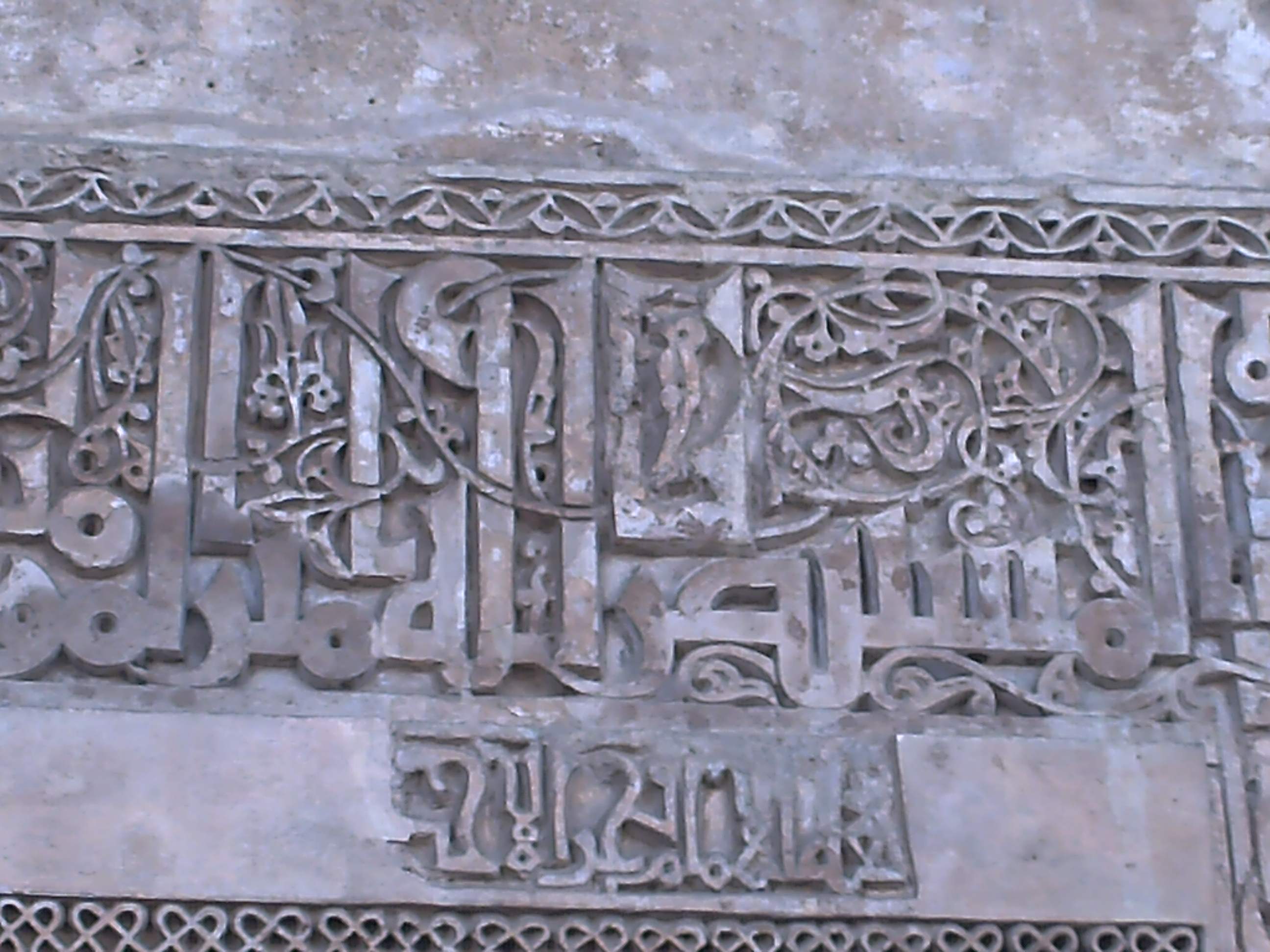
al-Mustansir's name engraved on the mihrab

== See also ==
- Family tree of Muhammad linking Prophets to Shi'ite Imams
- List of Ismaili imams
- List of rulers of Egypt
- Juyushi Mosque
- Fatimids
- Isma'ilism
- Nizari
- Aga Khan

== Sources ==
- Bianquis, Thierry (1989). Damas et la Syrie sous la domination fatimide (359-468/969-1076): essai d'interprétation de chroniques arabes médiévales. Deuxième tome (in French). Damascus: Institut français de Damas. ISBN 978-2-35159131-4.
- Brett, Michael (2017). The Fatimid Empire. The Edinburgh History of the Islamic Empires. Edinburgh: Edinburgh University Press. ISBN 978-0-7486-4076-8.
- Daftary, Farhad (2007). The Ismāʿı̄lı̄s: Their History and Doctrines (Second ed.). Cambridge: Cambridge University Press. ISBN 978-0-521-61636-2.
- Halm, Heinz (2003). Die Kalifen von Kairo: Die Fatimiden in Ägypten, 973–1074 [The Caliphs of Cairo: The Fatimids in Egypt, 973–1074] (in German). Munich: C. H. Beck. ISBN 3-406-48654-1.
- Halm, Heinz (2014). Kalifen und Assassinen: Ägypten und der vordere Orient zur Zeit der ersten Kreuzzüge, 1074–1171 [Caliphs and Assassins: Egypt and the Near East at the Time of the First Crusades, 1074–1171] (in German). Munich: C. H. Beck. doi:10.17104/9783406661648-1. ISBN 978-3-406-66163-1.
- Walker, Paul E. (1995). "Succession to Rule in the Shiite Caliphate". Journal of the American Research Center in Egypt. 32: 239–264. doi:10.2307/40000841. JSTOR 40000841.
- Hamdānī, Ḥusain F. al-, and Fatimid Khalifa al-Mustanṣir bi’llāh. “The Letters of Al-Mustanṣir Bi’llāh.” Bulletin of the School of Oriental Studies, University of London 7, no. 2 (1934): 307–24. http://www.jstor.org/stable/607507.

al-Mustansir Fatimid dynasty Born: 2 July 1029 Died: 29 December 1094
Regnal titles
Preceded by al-Zahir	Fatimid Caliph; 13 June 1036 – 29 December 1094	Succeeded by al-Musta'li
Shia Islam titles
Preceded by al-Zahir	Imam of Isma'ilism; 13 June 1036 – 29 December 1094	Succeeded by al-Musta'li as Imam of Musta'li Isma'ilism
Preceded by al-Zahir	Imam of Isma'ilism; 13 June 1036 – 29 December 1094	Succeeded by Nizar as Imam of Nizari Isma'ilism
