= Al-Muhtadi (Nizari imam) =

Imam of the Nizari Ismailis

Al-Muhtadi ibn al-Hadi المهتدي بن الهادي
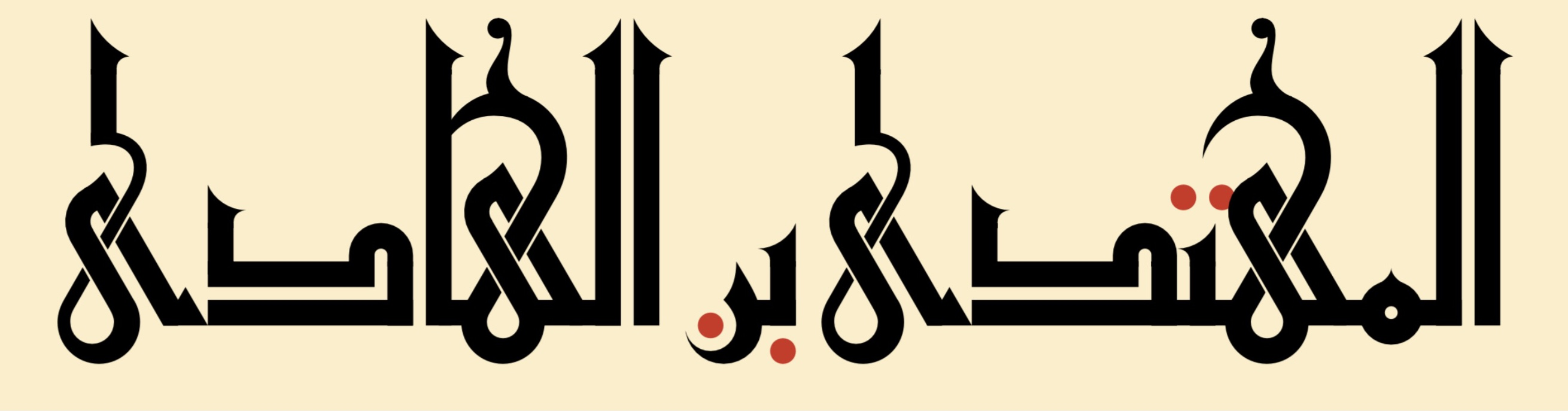
- Born: 502 AH/1109CE
- Died: 552 AH/1158CE
- Resting place: Lambsar Castle
- Other names: Muhammad al-Muhtadi, Mohammed I, محمد المهتدي
- Term: 530 AH/1136 CE - 552 AH/1158CE
- Predecessor: Ali al-Hadi
- Successor: Hasan al-Qahir
- Children: Hasan al-Qahir

Muhammad (I) al-Muhtadi (Arabic: محمد المهتدي, romanized: Muḥammad al-Muhtadī), was the 21st Imam of the Nizari Ismailis. He was a concealed Imam.

According to Ismaili historiography, al-Muhtadi (the Rightly Guided) was the elder son of the 20th Nizari Imam, al-Hadi, who moved around 1094 from Egypt to Northern Persia close to the region around Alamut. Here he was under the protection of the Nizari leaders Hasan-i Sabbah (d. 1124) and Kiya Buzurg-Ummid (d. 1138).

== Life ==
Muhammad bin Ali, surnamed al-Muhtadi is reported to have been born in 502/1109 at the castle of Lambsar. He was the first Ismaili Nizari Imam to be born in Persia. He is also known as Muhtadi and Muhammad I. He became the Imam of the Nizari Ismailis after the death of his father, Imam al-Hadi, in the year 530 AH.

His first move was to shift his headquarter to the fortress of Alamut and he focused on developing the Ismaili Army (Fidais) to be able to defend the Ismaili fortresses from the invaders. He also paid attention to the organisation of the Da'is and to introducing them to the core principles of the Shia Ismaili Islamic beliefs. He also trained them to develop skills in articulating and debating issues dealing with philosophy, Islamic jurisprudence and Islamic beliefs. He also created an innovative coding system where numbers were used instead of letters, for safe internal and external communications to protect them from their enemies. Imam al-Muhtadi used to live a life of asceticism and austerity.

The commander Kiya Buzrug Ummid laid a firm foundation of the Nizari Ismaili state as an independent territory in Persia and Syria. It is documented that he also minted some Nizari coin. He died in 532/1138 after ruling for 14 years. Imam al-Mhtadi appointed his son Muhammad bin Kiya Ummid as the third hujjat and ruler. Muhammad bin Kiya Buzurg was the commander of his armies and directed the affairs of the state.

The deposed Abbasid caliph (Al-Rashid Billah) allegedly came to attack the Ismaili fortresses in June 1138 and was intercepted by the Ismaili Fidais and was assassinated.

There is a well documented letter with the Syrian Ismaili Nizari community and published by Mustafa Ghalib in 1953 coming from the Imam al-Muhtadi to his followers where he confirms that he is the grandson of Imam Nizar bin Mustansirbillah and where he also appoints Zen ibn Abi Ilfargin as the head Dai for Syria and recommended the followers to abandon hate and to live with unity and solidarity.

In 1966, the American Numismatic Society, New York acquired a coin from this time, minted in 553/1158. It was illustrated in the American Numismatic Society's Annual Report for 1966 (pl.III,2). George C. Miles gave its detail of the Alamut Coins (Orientalia Lovaniensa Periodica, 3–5, 1972–74, pp. 155–162). Its size is 14 mm., weighing 0.635 gm. Its obverse side bears the name, "Muhammad bin (Kiya) Buzrug Ummid" and in the marginal legend, the name of the mint, kursi al-Daylam and the date 553 A.H. (1158 A.D.) has been clearly inscribed. The reverse area begins with the Shi’ite formula: "Ali is the friend of God" and the next three lines read: al-Mustafa li-Dinillah, Nizar (Nizar, the chosen for the religion of God). These three lines are followed by the marginal legend: amir al-mo’minin, salwat Allah alayhi wa-ala aba’ihi al-tahirin wa-abna’hi al-akramin (the blessings of God be upon him and upon his ancestors, the pure ones; and upon his descendants, the most honourable ones). George C. Miles reproduced the photographs of the six coins: There are few other coins minted at kursi al-Daylam with the same legends, differing only in dates.

It implies that the six coins from above had been struck during the period of Imam al-Muhtadi (530-552/1136-1157), and the two coins during the period of Imam al-Qahir (552-557/1157-1162).

Imam al-Muhtadi was also taking care of the horses bred by his father in the fortress of Lamasar. He is also reported to have taken several visits of surrounding castles in Rudhbar. He died in 552/1157 at the age of 52 years. He vested the office of Imamate to his elder son, Hasan al-Qahir.

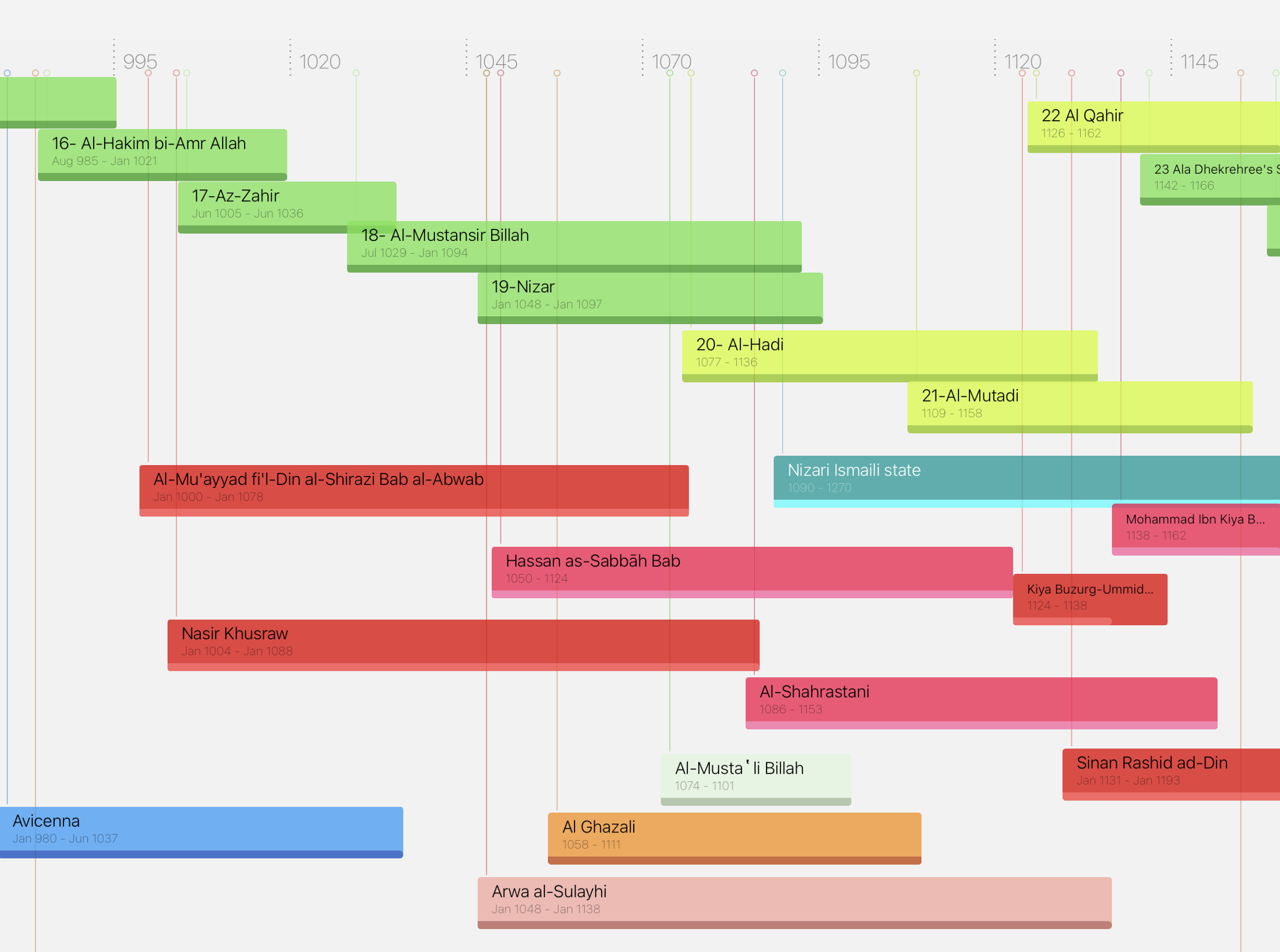
Timeline depicting the transition of Ismaili Nizari seat from Egypt to Persia between 980 and 1153, with important dates around the 20th Nizari Ismaili Imam Al-Hadi.
