= Al-Musta'li =

Fatimid caliph and imam from 1094 to 1101

al-Musta'li Billah المستعلي بالله
- Caliph; Amir al-Mu'minīn
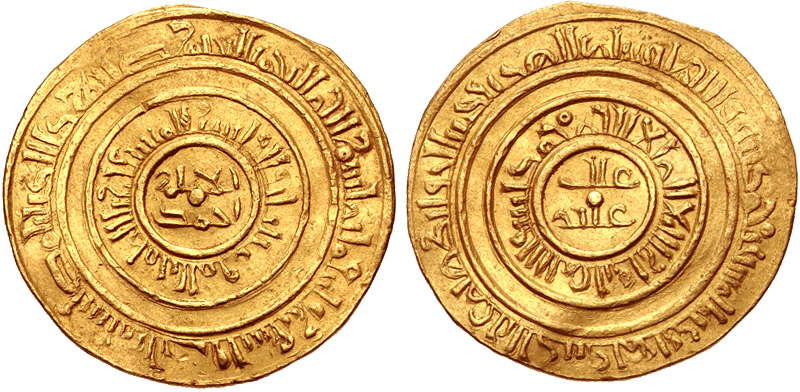
- Gold dinar minted in Fustat in the name of al-Musta'li, 1099/1100

Imam–Caliph of the Fatimid Caliphate
- Reign: 1094–1101
- Predecessor: al-Mustansir Billah
- Successor: al-Amir bi-Ahkam Allah
- Born: 15/16 September 1074; Cairo
- Died: 11/12 December 1101; Cairo
- Issue: al-Amir bi-Ahkam Allah
- Dynasty: Fatimid
- Father: al-Mustansir Billah
- Religion: Musta'li Isma'ilism

Abū al-Qāsim Aḥmad ibn al-Mustanṣir (Arabic: أبو القاسم أحمد بن المستنصر; 15/16 September 1074 – 11/12 December 1101), better known by his regnal name al-Mustaʿlī biʾllāh (المستعلي بالله, lit. 'The One Raised Up by God'), was the ninth Fatimid caliph and the 19th imam (Note: An imam is a spiritual leader of the Islamic community of the faithful (ummah) as successor of Muhammad. After the civil wars of the early Muslim period, the Sunni mainstream followed the caliphs as successors of Muhammad and attached few conditions to leadership positions. On the other hand, the Shi'a gradually developed the notion of the imam as a singular, divinely invested and guided successor of Muhammad, a figure endowed with unique qualities and the living proof (hujja) of God. The position was reserved for a member of the family of Muhammad, with Muhammad's son-in-law Ali ibn Abi Talib being considered the first such imam. After the death of the imam Ja'far al-Sadiq in 765, the Isma'ilis followed a line of succession from al-Sadiq's son Isma'il that led to the imam–caliphs of the Fatimid dynasty.) of Musta'li Ismailism.

Although not the eldest (and most likely the youngest) of the sons of Caliph al-Mustansir Billah, al-Musta'li became caliph through the machinations of his brother-in-law, the vizier al-Afdal Shahanshah. In response, his oldest brother and most likely candidate for their father's succession, Nizar, rose in revolt in Alexandria but was defeated and executed. This caused a major split in the Isma'ili movement. Many communities, especially in Persia and Iraq, split off from the officially sponsored Isma'ili hierarchy and formed their own Nizari movement, holding Nizar and his descendants as the rightful imams.

Throughout his reign, al-Musta'li remained subordinate to al-Afdal, who was the de facto ruler of the Fatimid Caliphate. The Caliphate's core territory in Egypt experienced a period of good government and prosperity, but the Fatimids suffered setbacks in Syria, where they were faced with the advance of the Sunni Seljuk Turks. Al-Afdal managed to recover the port city of Tyre, and even recapture Jerusalem in the turmoil caused by the arrival of the First Crusade in northern Syria. Despite Fatimid attempts to make common cause with the Crusaders against the Seljuks, the latter advanced south and captured Jerusalem in July 1099, sealing their success with a major victory over the Fatimid army led by al-Afdal at the Battle of Ascalon shortly after. Al-Musta'li died in 1101 and was succeeded by his five-year-old son, al-Amir.

== Life ==
=== Origin and background ===
Ahmad, the future al-Musta'li, was born in Cairo on 20 Muharram 467 AH (15 or 16 September 1074), or perhaps on 18 or 20 Muharram 468 AH (2 or 4 September 1075) to the eighth Fatimid caliph, al-Mustansir Billah (r. 1036–1094), and was most likely the youngest of all of al-Mustansir's sons. (Note: During his long reign, al-Mustansir had several offspring, but no complete list exists. Furthermore, many of his sons shared parts of their names, making their identification difficult. Historian Paul E. Walker estimated that al-Mustansir "had at the minimum seventeen sons whose names we can recover".) Another son of al-Mustansir had been born in 1060 with the same name—Abu'l-Qasim Ahmad—as the future al-Musta'li, and some later sources have confused this as al-Musta'li's birth date. It is assumed by modern scholars that this older brother had died in the meantime, allowing the name to be reused for al-Musta'li. In one source he is called Abu'l-Qasim Ahmad 'the Younger' (or possibly 'the Youngest', i.e. of all sons).

At the time of his birth, the Fatimid Caliphate, established in Egypt with Cairo as its capital since 973, was undergoing a profound crisis: it had lost most of Syria to the Seljuk Turks, while in Egypt itself, clashes between the Fatimid army's Turkish and black African troops led to the breakdown of the central government and widespread famine and anarchy, leaving al-Mustansir as a powerless figurehead, virtually imprisoned in his palace and at the mercy of military warlords. In January 1074, the general Badr al-Jamali assumed the vizierate and proceeded to restore peace and order in the country and repel a Seljuk invasion, saving al-Mustansir's life and his dynasty; but at the cost of al-Mustansir delegating all his powers over the government, army, and the religious and judicial administration to him.

=== Disputed succession ===
A turban or shawl end produced during al-Musta'li's reign, with a tiraz proclaiming "proximate victory to the servant of Allah and his close friend Ma'add Abu Tamim, the imam Ahmad al-Qasim al-Musta'li bi-Allah and his sons"

Ahmad's oldest half-brother, Nizar ibn al-Mustansir, was considered at the time as the most likely successor to their father, as had been the custom until then; indeed Nizar is often stated even by modern historians to have been the designated (Note: The concept of designation (nass) is central to the early Shi'a, and particularly the Isma'ili, conception of the imamate, but it also presented complications: as the imam possessed God's infallibility (isma), he could not possibly err, especially in as crucial a matter as the selection of his heir. Appointed heirs predeceasing their fathers were thus a source of considerable embarrassment. Therefore, The custom emerged, though an heir might clearly be favoured during his father's reign, the nass was often withheld until shortly before the ruling imam's death, proclaimed in the latter's testament, or left as a bequest with a third party.) successor of his father. No formal designation of Nizar as heir is recorded by the time of al-Mustansir's death; both Badr al-Jamali and his son and successor al-Afdal Shahanshah favoured the accession of Ahmad. Shortly before his death, al-Mustansir consented to the wedding of Ahmad with Badr's daughter Sitt al-Mulk.

Al-Mustansir died on 29 December 1094, on the day of Eid al-Ghadir, the most important Shi'a festival. According to the Mamluk-era historian al-Maqrizi, al-Afdal placed Ahmad on the throne and declared him caliph as al-Musta'li bi'llah (lit. 'The One Raised Up by God'). He then summoned three of al-Mustansir's sons—Nizar, Abdallah, and Isma'il, apparently the most prominent among the caliph's progeny—to the palace, where they were called on to do homage to their brother. All three refused, each claiming to have been designated as successor by their father. This refusal apparently took al-Afdal completely by surprise, and the brothers were even allowed to leave the palace; but while Abdallah and Isma'il sought refuge in a nearby mosque, Nizar immediately fled Cairo. To add to the confusion, when learning of al-Mustansir's death, Baraqat, the chief missionary (da'i) of Cairo (and thus head of the Isma'ili religious establishment), proclaimed Abdallah as caliph with the regnal name al-Muwaffaq ('The Blessed One'). Soon, however, al-Afdal regained control: Baraqat was arrested (and later executed), Abdallah and Isma'il were placed under surveillance and eventually acknowledged Ahmad, and a grand assembly of officials was held, which acclaimed Ahmad as imam and caliph.

In 1122, Ahmad's son and successor, al-Amir (r. 1101–1130), issued a public proclamation, the al-Hidaya al-Amiriyya, to defend his father's succession, especially against the claims of Nizar's partisans. In it he put forth several arguments, such as the fact that when al-Mustansir sent his sons to the provinces to protect them from the turmoil at the capital, this was supposedly done in order of rank, those closest to Cairo being the highest in rank: Abu Abdallah was to go to Acre; Abu'l-Qasim Muhammad (father of al-Hafiz, caliph in 1131–1149) to Ascalon; Nizar to the port of Damietta; and Ahmad was not even allowed to leave the palace. Modern historians such as Paul E. Walker point out that this was a deliberately misconstrued argument, as the princes were sent away for their protection, not because of their rank. According to Walker, Abu Abdallah's dispatch to Acre, where the strong army of Badr al-Jamali was stationed, is, if anything, an indication of his high importance and of his father's desire to keep him safe. At the same time, since the reliable al-Maqrizi dates the event to 1068, the underage son left in Cairo was clearly not the future al-Musta'li, who had not been born yet, but rather his namesake older brother.

Other pro-Musta'li traditions maintain that Ahmad was designated as heir by al-Mustansir at Ahmad's wedding banquet. On the occasion of the proclamation of the al-Hidaya al-Amiriyya, furthermore, a supposed full sister of Nizar was presented, hidden behind a veil, who affirmed that on his deathbed, al-Mustansir had chosen Ahmad as heir and left this as a bequest with one of Ahmad's sisters.

Modern historians, such as Farhad Daftary, believe that these stories are most likely attempts to justify and retroactively legitimise Ahmad's accession, which they view as a de facto coup d'état by al-Afdal. According to this view, al-Afdal chose his brother-in-law because his own position was still insecure, as he had but recently succeeded his father Badr. Ahmad, who was tied to al-Afdal by virtue of his marriage and completely dependent on him for his accession, would be a compliant figurehead who was unlikely to threaten al-Afdal's as yet fragile hold on power by attempting to appoint another to the vizierate.

=== Nizar's revolt and the Nizari schism ===
The rival lines of succession of the Isma'ili imams resulting from the Musta'li–Nizari and Hafizi–Tayyibi schisms

After fleeing from Cairo, Nizar went to Alexandria, where he gained the support of the local governor and populace, and proclaimed himself imam and caliph with the regnal name of al-Mustafa li-Din Allah ('The Chosen One for God's Religion'). Nizar's partisans repulsed al-Afdal's first attempt to seize Alexandria, and Nizar's forces raided up to the outskirts of Cairo. Eventually, Nizar's forces were pushed back to Alexandria, which was placed under siege, until Nizar and his remaining followers were forced to surrender. They were taken back to Cairo, where Nizar was immured and left to die. A letter sent to the queen of Yemen, Arwa al-Sulayhi, announcing al-Musta'li's accession, gives the officially disseminated version of events. According to the letter, like the other sons of al-Mustansir, Nizar had at first accepted al-Musta'li's imamate and paid him homage, before being moved by greed and envy to revolt. The events up to the capitulation of Alexandria are reported in some detail, but nothing is mentioned of Nizar's fate.

These events caused a bitter and permanent schism in the Isma'ili movement, that lasts to the present day. Although al-Musta'li was recognised by the Fatimid establishment and the official Isma'ili missionary organisation (the da'wa), as well as the Isma'ili communities dependent on it in Egypt, Syria and Yemen, most of the Isma'ili communities in the wider Middle East, and especially Persia and Iraq, rejected his accession. Whether out of conviction or as a convenient excuse, the Persian Isma'ilis under Hassan-i Sabbah swiftly recognised Nizar as the rightful imam, severed relations with Cairo, and set up their own independent hierarchy (the da'wa jadida, lit. 'new calling'). This marked the permanent split of the Isma'ili movement into the rival branches of Musta'li Isma'ilism and Nizari Isma'ilism. At least one of Nizar's sons, al-Husayn, fled in 1095 with other members of the dynasty (including three of al-Mustansir's other sons, Muhammad, Isma'il, and Tahir) from Egypt to the Maghreb, where they formed a sort of opposition in exile to the new regime in Cairo. As late as 1162, descendants, or purported descendants, of Nizar appeared to challenge the Fatimid caliphs, and were able to attract considerable followings based on lingering loyalist sentiments of the population.

=== Reign ===
Throughout his reign, al-Musta'li was subordinate to al-Afdal. According to the 13th-century Egyptian historian Ibn Muyassar, "[al-Musta'li] had no noteworthy life, since al-Afdal directed the affairs of state like a sultan or king, not like a vizier." Al-Afdal even supplanted the caliph in public ceremonies, keeping al-Musta'li out of sight, confined to the palace.

Al-Afdal was a capable administrator, and his good governance ensured the continued prosperity of Egypt throughout the reign. Al-Musta'li is praised for his upright character by the Sunni contemporary historian Ibn al-Qalanisi, though other medieval historians stress his fanatical devotion to Shi'ism; it appears that the Isma'ili da'wa was very active during his reign. The 15th-century Yemeni pro-Musta'li religious leader and historian Idris Imad al-Din preserves much information about his dealings with the Isma'ili da'wa in Yemen, particularly with Queen Arwa and the local da'i, Yahya ibn Lamak ibn Malik al-Hammadi.

In foreign affairs, the Fatimids faced an increasing rivalry with the Sunni Seljuks and the Seljuk-backed Abbasid caliph, al-Mustazhir: the Seljuks expanded their rule in Syria up to Gaza and, in 1095, the Abbasid caliph published a letter proclaiming the Fatimids' claims of Alid descent to be fraudulent. The Fatimids achieved some successes, with the voluntary submission of Apamea in northern Syria in 1096, followed by the recovery of Tyre in February/March 1097. Al-Afdal also tried to conclude an alliance with the Seljuk ruler of Aleppo, Ridwan, against Duqaq, the Seljuk ruler of Damascus. In early 1097, Ridwan agreed to recognise the suzerainty of al-Musta'li, and on 28 August had the Friday sermon read on behalf of the Fatimid caliph. This provoked such a backlash among the other Seljuk rulers of Syria that Ridwan was forced to backtrack after four weeks, and dropped al-Musta'li's name in favour of al-Mustazhir.

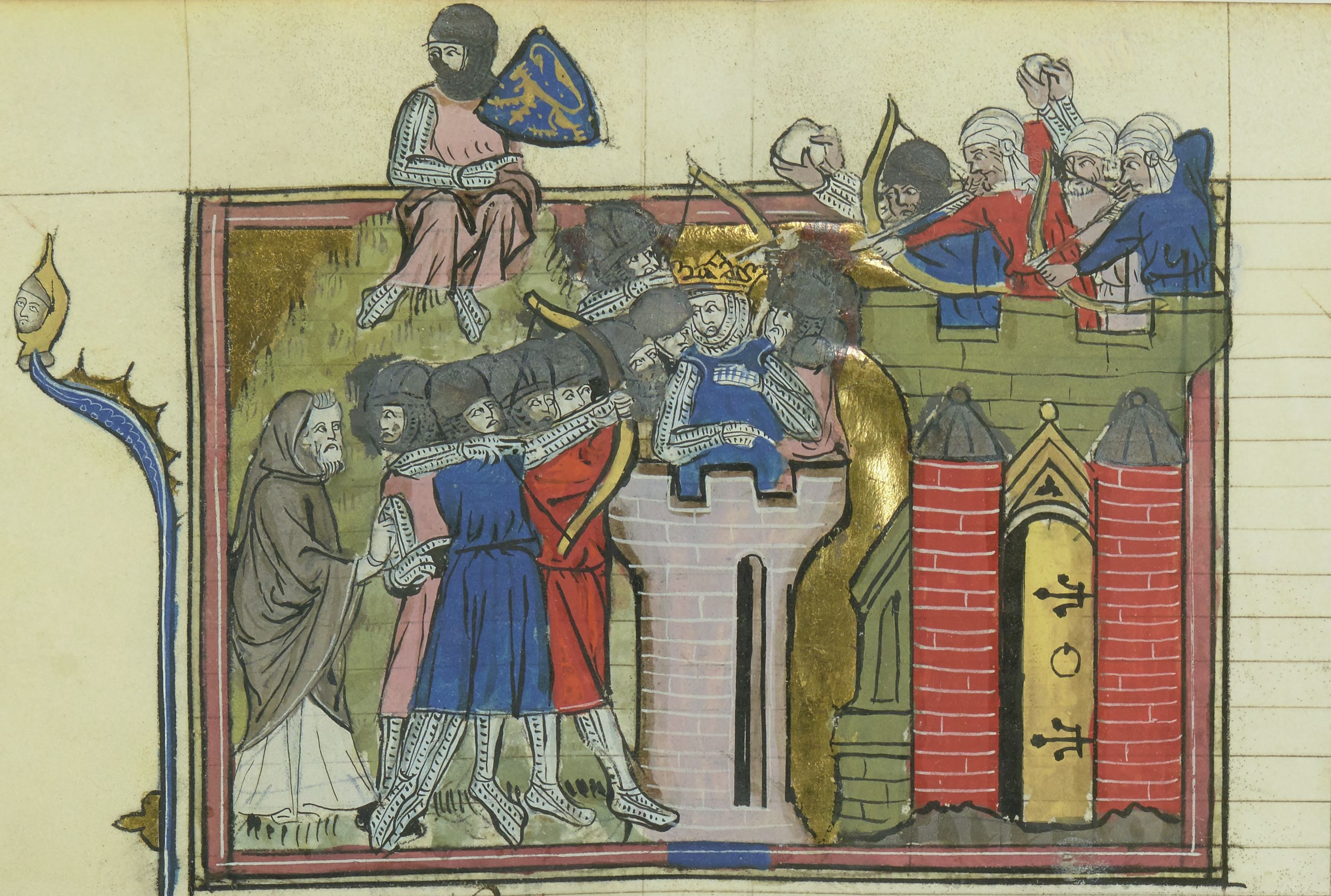
The capture of Jerusalem by the Crusaders, 14th-century miniature

In the same year, 1097, the First Crusade entered Syria and laid siege to Antioch. Al-Afdal sent an embassy to make contact with the Crusaders, and used the distraction provided by the Crusade to recover control of Jerusalem from its Artuqid Turkish rulers in July/August 1098. This exposed the Fatimids to accusations by Sunni sources that they had made common cause with the Crusaders; the 13th-century historian Ibn al-Athir even claims that the Fatimids invited the Crusaders to Syria to combat the Seljuks, who previously stood ready to invade Egypt itself. Believing that he had reached an agreement with the Crusaders, al-Afdal did not expect them to march south, and was caught by surprise when they moved against Jerusalem in 1099. The city was captured after a siege on 15 July 1099, and the subsequent defeat of a Fatimid army under al-Afdal's personal command at the Battle of Ascalon on 12 August 1099 confirmed the new status quo. As a result of the Crusader advance, many Syrians fled to Egypt, where a famine broke out in 1099 or 1100 as a result.

Al-Musta'li died on 17 Safar 495 AH (11 or 12 December 1101, amid rumours that he had been poisoned by al-Afdal. He left three infant sons, of whom the eldest, the not quite five years old al-Mansur, was swiftly proclaimed caliph with the regnal name al-Amir bi-Ahkam Allah.

== See also ==
- List of Ismaili imams
- Lists of rulers of Egypt

== Sources ==
- Brett, Michael (2017). The Fatimid Empire. The Edinburgh History of the Islamic Empires. Edinburgh: Edinburgh University Press. ISBN 978-0-7486-4076-8.
- Daftary, Farhad (2007). The Ismāʿı̄lı̄s: Their History and Doctrines (Second ed.). Cambridge: Cambridge University Press. ISBN 978-0-521-61636-2.
- Gibb, H. A. R. (1993). "al-Mustaʿlī bi'llāh". In Bosworth, C. E.; van Donzel, E.; Heinrichs, W. P. & Pellat, Ch. (eds.). The Encyclopaedia of Islam, Second Edition. Volume VII: Mif–Naz. Leiden: E. J. Brill. p. 725. ISBN 978-90-04-09419-2.
- Halm, Heinz (2014). Kalifen und Assassinen: Ägypten und der vordere Orient zur Zeit der ersten Kreuzzüge, 1074–1171 [Caliphs and Assassins: Egypt and the Near East at the Time of the First Crusades, 1074–1171] (in German). Munich: C. H. Beck. doi:10.17104/9783406661648-1. ISBN 978-3-406-66163-1.
- Madelung, W. (1971). "Imāma". In Lewis, B.; Ménage, V. L.; Pellat, Ch. & Schacht, J. (eds.). The Encyclopaedia of Islam, Second Edition. Volume III: H–Iram. Leiden: E. J. Brill. pp. 1163–1169. OCLC 495469525.
- Özkuyumcu, Nadir (2006). "Müsta'lî-Billâh el-Fâtımî". TDV Encyclopedia of Islam, Vol. 32 (el-Münci̇d – Nasi̇h) (in Turkish). Istanbul: Presidency of Religious Affairs, Centre for Islamic Studies. p. 115. ISBN 978-975-389-454-8.
- Stern, S. M. (1950). "The Epistle of the Fatimid Caliph al-Āmir (al-Hidāya al-Āmiriyya): Its Date and Its Purpose". The Journal of the Royal Asiatic Society of Great Britain and Ireland. 82 (1): 20–31. doi:10.1017/S0035869X00103284. JSTOR 25222370. S2CID 162099722.
- Walker, Paul E. (1995). "Succession to Rule in the Shiite Caliphate". Journal of the American Research Center in Egypt. 32: 239–264. doi:10.2307/40000841. JSTOR 40000841.

al-Musta'li Fatimid dynasty Born: 15/16 September 1074 Died: 12 December 1101
Regnal titles
Preceded by al-Mustansir	Fatimid Caliph; 29 December 1094 – 12 December 1101	Succeeded by al-Amir
Shia Islam titles
Preceded by al-Mustansir	Imam of Musta'li Isma'ilism; 29 December 1094 – 12 December 1101	Succeeded by al-Amir
