= Muhammad II of Alamut =

24th Ismaili Nizari Imam Nūr al-Dīn Muhammad from 1166 to 1210

Nūr al-Dīn Muḥammad II: نورالدین محمد
- 24th Ismaili Nizari Imam Nūr al-Dīn Muḥammad

24th Imam of the Nizari Ismaili Shias
- Tenure: 1166 – September 1210
- Predecessor: Hasan 'Ala Zikrihi's-Salam
- Successor: Jalal al-Din Hasan
- Born: 542 AH/1148 AD; Alamut Castle, Nizari Ismaili state
- Died: 607 AH/September 1210 AD

Nūr al-Dīn Muḥammad II (نورالدین محمد) or ʾAʿlā Muḥammad (اعلی محمد) (542 AH/1148 CE-607 AH/1210 CE) was the Nizari Isma'ili Imām of Alamūt who reigned the longest period out of any Lord (Khudawand) of Alamut, forty-four years. An Assassin, he affirmed the policies of his father, Hassan Ala Dhikrihi's-Salam, who had been stabbed to death a year after proclaiming Qiyāma, or Resurrection (interpreted in a spiritual esoteric manner of the truth being unveiled with the Ismailis in this case).

== Name and honorifics ==
He is known as "‘A'lā’ al-Dīn" in some manuscripts of Kalam-i Pir and by some other historians. Other manuscripts of Kalam-i Pir have him as Diya al-Dīn. Rashid al-Dīn Hamadani has him as Nūr al-Dīn, but Hodgson is of the opinion that this is dubious.

== Biography ==
Nur al-Din Muhammad, surnamed Ala, also called Ala Muhammad or Muhammad bin Hasan, was born around 550/1155 or 553/1158 in Alamut. He is also known as Muhammad II, and sometimes as Ziaruddin Muhammad. His mother related to the Buwahid family. Immediately upon his accession, he arrested Hasan bin Namavar and his relatives and sentenced them to death.

Bernard Lewis writes in "The Assassins" (London, 1967, p. 95) that, "Hassan was succeeded by his son Muhammad, who proceeded to confirm that his father and therefore he himself were descendants of Nizar, and subsequent Imams. He is said to have been a prolific writer, and during his long reign, the doctrine of the Resurrection was developed and elaborated." B. Hourcade writes that, "Hassan's son, Nur al-Din Mohammad II (d. 607/1210), consolidated the work of his father, whom he pronounced the true Imam, the secret son of a descendant of Nizar who had hidden at Alamut." (cf. "Encyclopaedia of Iran and Islam" ed. by Yarshater, London, 1982, p. 800).

Ala Muhammad was greatly engaged in his interest on philosophy and esoteric doctrines. His literary output was voluminous and had compiled several books on Koranic exegesis to broach the doctrines of the Ismailis. He was well steeped in Arabic and composed many proverbs and poetry in Arabic, whose fragments had been into the memories of the Muslims in Qazwin. Few misconception had started among the Muslims during his period about the qiyama in Iran and Syria, therefore, Ala Muhammad wrote several tracts to justify the doctrines of qiyama. In his elaboration of the doctrine of qiyama, he also assigned as usual a central role to the Imam. It further implied a complete personal transformation of the Ismailis who henceforth were expected to see nothing but the Imam and the manifestation of the divine truth in him. The Imam was defined in his essence as the epiphany (mazhar) of God on earth.

The period of Ala Muhammad was longer, in which there had been no war between the Ismailis and neighbouring rulers. It is possible that the Abbasid and Seljuq powers were at their downfall, and were incapable to attack the Ismaili castles.

Meanwhile, an important political change took place in Iran and other eastern lands. The Seljuqs disintegrated after Sanjar's death in 552/1157, being replaced by the Turkish amirs and generals. It must be remembered that Tughril Beg (d. 455/1063) had founded the Seljuqid empire in 447/1055 and was declined in 590/1194. This dynasty produced 15 rulers belonging to seven generations.

Towards the end of the twelfth century a new power emerged in the east. South of the Aral sea lay the land of Khawaraz in Central Asia, the seat of an old civilisation, whose hereditary rulers assumed the old title of the kings as the Khwarazmshahs. In about 586/1190, the Khawarazmshah Alauddin Tekish (d. 596/1200) occupied Khorasan, thus becoming master of eastern Iran. The Khawarazmians soon came to have an impressive empire of their own, stretching from the borders of India to Anatolia. The Seljuq dynasty came to an end everywhere except in Anatolia when Alauddin Tekish defeated Tughril III at Ray in 590/1194. The triumphant Khawarazmshah was the obvious ruler to fill the vacancy created by the Seljuqs, and in the following year, the Abbasid caliph Nasir (d. 622/1225) invested Alauddin Tekish with the sultanate of western Iran, Khorasan and Turkistan.

We come across an instance of Ustandar Hazarasf bin Shahrnush (560-586/1164-1190), the Baduspanid ruler of Rustamdar and Ruyan, who had harboured himself at Alamut. According to "Jamiut-Tawarikh" (pp. 170–173), Hazarasf had cemented his close relation with the Ismailis residing at Rudhbar and granted them few castles in his territories. When his relation deteriorated with his superior, Husam ad-Dawla Ardashir (567-602/1172-1206), the Bawandid Ispahbad of Mazandarn, he took refuge at Alamut as a result. In due course, Hazarasf raided his former territories with the help of the Ismaili fidais and killed an Alid ruler of Daylaman. He was at last arrested and killed by Ardashir in 586/1190.

The hostile Sunni rulers had maintained the tradition of occasionally massacring the Ismailis. It is reported, for instance, according to Ibn Athir (12th vol., pp. 76–7) that a bulk of people accused of Ismailism were killed in lower Iraq in the year 600/1204.

=== Succession ===
Nūr ad-Dīn Muḥammad II was born in Alamut Castle. When he ascended to leadership of Alamūt, he immediately avenged his father's death by executing his father's killer, Hasan ibn Namawar (who apparently could not tolerate the reforms and claims of Hassan Ala Dhikrihi's-Salam and wanted to reinstate Shari'ah) and the latter's relatives upon succeeding his father at nineteen years old. This act put to rest all of the remaining members of the Buyids.

=== Doctrinal development and elaboration ===
Muhammad II is known to have been a prolific writer, and he developed and elaborated on his father's doctrine of the Qiyāma. He explicitly confirmed that his father had been in fact a Nizārī Ismā'īlī Imām, and that he himself was an Imām as well. Whereas the founder of the Qiyāma doctrine Hassan Ala Dhikrihi's-Salam is believed to have only claimed to have been an Imām in hāqiqā and in the batin, not claiming to be the zahir Imām actually descended from Ali and the Nizārī Ismā'īlī Imāms. Nūr ad-Dīn Muḥammad II claimed an alternate genealogy for his father and himself which denied descent from Muhammad b. Buzurg-Ummid, who was only an apparent father, but rather insisted that his father was "the son of a descendant of Nizar who had secretly found refuge in a village near Alamūt." The Nizārī Ismā'īlīs accepted the line of Imāms starting with Hassan Ala Dhikrihi's-Salam (in retrospect) and understood them as having come out in the open once again after seventy years (as their Imām was in concealment since the time of Nizar). One of the most important things that Qiyāma meant on a practical level was the nullification of Islamic law, since the batin (inner reality) had been unveiled by the Nizārī Ismā'īlī Imāms, and the true "meanings hidden behind" the law had become manifest. The early chroniclers of this period (meaning Sunni historians decades after the event) cite this overturning of the law as the main reason that the Nizārī Ismā'īlīs were further condemned and considered malāhīda, a condemnatory term that could mean heretic or non-believer, for instance.

It is claimed that Nūr ad-Dīn Muḥammad II insisted that the Ismaili believers could see Allah in the Imām (as their seeing God in paradise was actually seeing the Imām). In other words, "the present Imām became the manifestation of the divine word or order to create, that is to say the cause of the spiritual world" and the Ismailis, through viewing the universe through the Imām, could in fact reach "a third level of being", seeing the batin of the batin, or the haqiqa, "a realm of spiritual life and awareness". Moreover, the Imām became known as identical to Ali, with every believer being associated in the spiritual relationship as roughly equivalent to Salman the Persian. Thus, he took Ismaili doctrine to a more esoteric place by expanding on the doctrines of his father Hassan Ala Dhikrihi's-Salam. It is tough to definitively distinguish what Hassan Ala Dhikrihi's-Salam proclaimed compared to his son Nūr ad-Dīn Muḥammad II because the latter only began to rule a year and a half after he Festival of Qiyāma, and we do not have a source about this from Hassan Ala Dhikrihi's-Salam with which to compare the words of Nūr ad-Dīn Muḥammad II.

=== Outside impact ===
The doctrine of Qiyāma was not observed by outside groups apparently, and politically Lewis claims that the period of Muhammad II was relatively uneventful, other than the assassination of a vizier of the caliph in Baghdad. The Nizārī Ismā'īlīs did not mix with the rest of Muslim society much at all during this period and were isolated in their mountain strongholds. This may have been in a sense because of the perception resulting from their Qiyāma doctrine, which viewed the Nizārī Ismā'īlīs as the sole custodians of the truth and only community that had the truth unveiled for them, resulting in a sort of paradise on earth for them to the exclusion of other Muslims and non-Muslims. There was more interaction with and knowledge of the Syrian Nizārī Ismā'īlī community during this period, which was led the da'i Rashid al-Din Sinan, famously known as the "Old Man of the Mountain" from Crusader sources.

== Qiyāmat al-Qiyāma ==
The Qiyāma was declared at an event on 8 August 1164 by Hasan 'Ala Dhikrihi's-Salam. He gathered the various da'is from the various realms for the occasion. The Qiyāma in Nizārī Ismā'īlī doctrine (at least of this period of Hasan 'Ala Dhikrihi's-Salam and Nūr al-Dīn Muḥammad II) is the spiritual resurrection. Ismaili cosmology includes a view of history that has a series of partial cycles and partial Qiyāmas, of which this incident was one, and not the ultimate and final Qiyāmat al-Qiyāma. This Qiyāma involves the qā'im (also known as qā'im-i qiyāmat or Resurrector of the Resurrection, which is a rank higher than an ordinary Imām) who comes in the seventh cycle of Ismaili cosmology to reveal the true, inner meaning of the law. The Qiyāma is in a sense bringing an era to an end and the dawning of a new one. In another sense, it also marks the coming out from a state of darkness to a period of enlightenment. During the Qiyāma the exoteric law no longer is necessary and the qa'im can supersede it. Nūr al-Dīn Muḥammad II gave the doctrine more in detail and developed it, for example by indicating that the true spiritual reality of the Imām was what was important and that Nizārī Ismā'īlīs who could perceive this and achieve a personal transformation were the successful ones. The role of the Imam became more paramount and it is only through him that Ismailis could achieve illumination. Nasir al-Din Tusi further elaborated and reconciled the doctrine of Qiyāma, in his Rawdāt al-Taslim (Garden of Submission), where he insists that the Qiyāma is not just a single event at the end of time, but it's a transitory period where the unveiled truth, or hāqiqā (spirituality and the eternal truth of religion), is revealed.

== Death ==
In 607/September 1210 Nūr ad-Dīn Muḥammad II died, possibly due to being poisoned. His successor was his son, Jalāluddīn Ḥassan III, who repudiated the policies of his father, proclaimed himself as following Sunni Islam and commanded his followers to follow Shari'a in a Sunni manner.

=== After Muhammad II ===
Upon Nūr al-Dīn Muḥammad II's death, his son, Jalāl al-Dīn Ḥassan III, acceded to the throne. Jalāl al-Dīn made some drastic changes to the doctrine and practices of the Ismailis, at least apparently, and it is claimed by some authors that he was dissatisfied with the Qiyāma. In any case, he reversed the Qiyāma and according to the (hostile toward Ismailis) historian Juwayni, he had a "conversion to Islam" (alternately read as he outwardly followed Sunni orthodoxy under taqiyya) and established ties and camaraderie with the Sunni Caliph of Baghdad, and other Sunni Muslim leaders of the period expressing his adoption of the shari'a. He was warmly received by those leaders and "all manner of favours were shown to him."

== Sources ==
Contemporary Sunni sources mention nothing about the Qiyāma of the Nizārī Ismā'īlīs of the Alamūt period, and some historians claim that this period and knowledge of its events apparently remained confined to the Nizārī Ismā'īlīs until the Mongols destroyed Alamut Castle, and Sunnis found their writings there (and wrote about it decades later). Among the primary means that we have knowledge of their writings and history is through the (prejudiced and unfavorable) histories of Juwayni (Tarikh-i Jahangushay-i Juvaini), Rashid al-Dīn (Jami' al-Tawarikh), and Kashani (Zubdat al-Tawarikh). However, there is one anonymous Nizārī Ismā'īlī treatise extant, named Haft Bab-i Baba Sayyidna, dating to the time of Muhammad II that provides us with some understanding of the doctrine of the Qiyāma from this period. Yet even this source is not a contemporary document recording the actual declaration of the Qiyāma.

Nur al-Din Muhammad II of the Ahl al-Bayt Banu Hashim Clan of the Banu Quraish Born: 1148 C.E Died: 1210 C.E.
Regnal titles
Preceded by Hassan Ala Dhikrihi's Salam	5th Ruler of Nizārī Ismā'īlī state and Commander of Alamut Castle; 1166–1210	Succeeded by Jalāl al-Dīn Ḥassan III
Shia Islam titles
Preceded by Hassan Ala Dhikrihi's Salam	Nūru-d-Dīn Muḥammad II; 24th Imām of Nizārī Ismā'īlīs; 1166–1210	Succeeded by Jalālu-d-Dīn Ḥassan III
