= Order of Assassins =

Nizari Isma'ili military order (1090–1256)

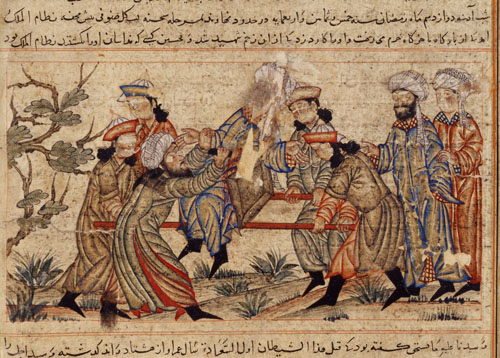
- 14th-century depiction of the assassination of Nizam al-Mulk, a Seljuk vizier, by a fida'i in 1092.
- Formation: 1090
- Founder: Hasan-i Sabbah
- Dissolved: 1256
- Headquarters: Alamut Castle (Persian Assassins); Masyaf Castle (Levantine Assassins)
- Location: Nizari Ismaili state
- Official language: Persian
- Imam: Hasan-i Sabbah (first); Muhammad II (last)

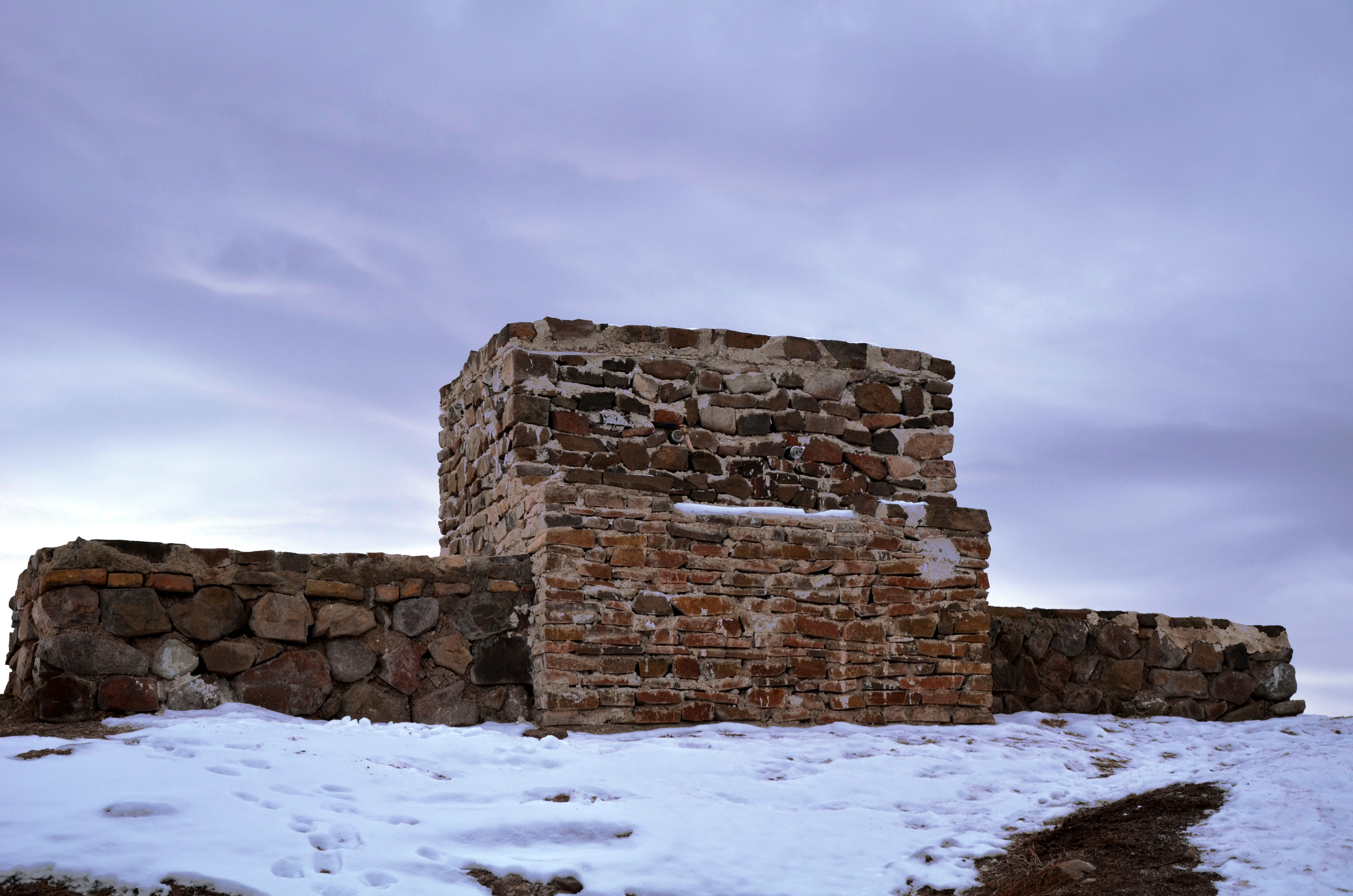
Remains of the Alamut Castle in Qazvin, Iran

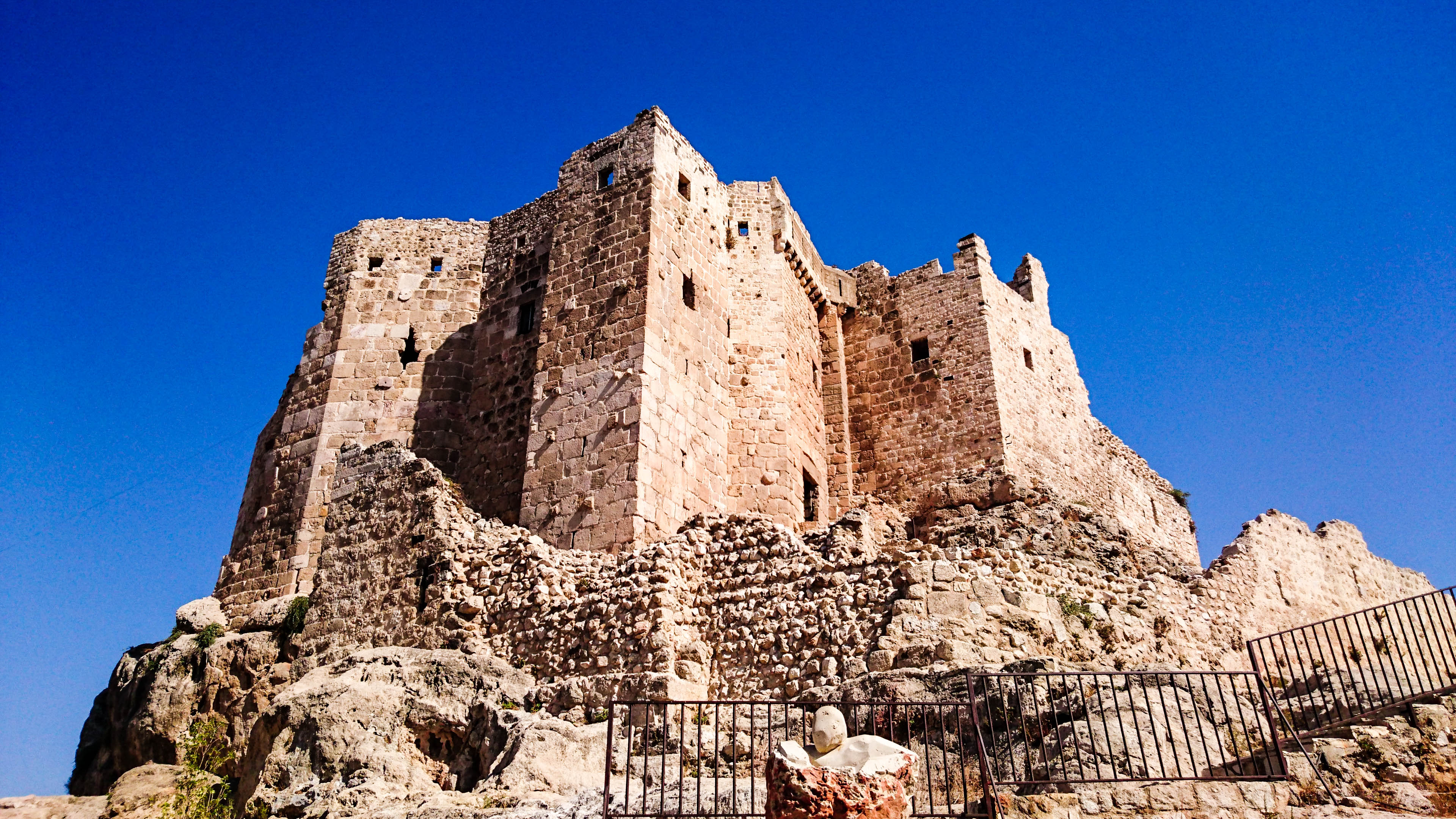
Masyaf Castle in Hama. It was the headquarters of the Assassins in the Levant. Picture taken in 2017

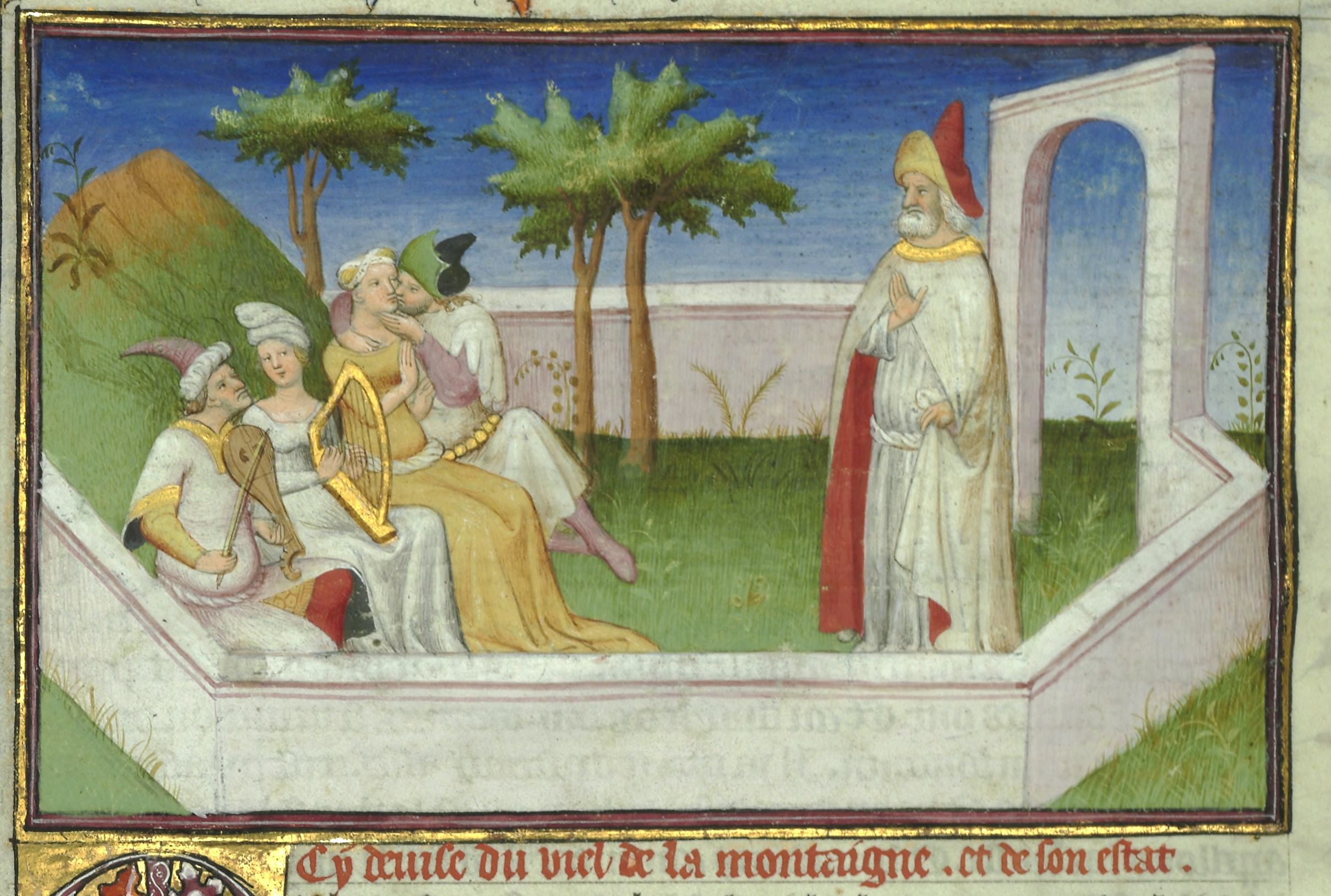
Hassan al-Sabbah (right) depicted with his followers, in the first edition of The Travels of Marco Polo, c. 1310

The Order of Assassins (Arabic: حَشّاشُون, romanized: Ḥaššāšūn; Persian: حشاشين, romanized: Haššāšīn) was a Nizari Isma'ili Shia Muslim military order founded by Hasan-i Sabbah in 1090. Based in the Nizari Isma'ili state, which comprised a network of mountain castles in Persia and Syria, they conducted several high-profile assassinations throughout the Levant during the Crusades. The Assassins held a strict subterfuge policy in the region and are believed to have killed hundreds of people who were deemed enemies of their state over the course of 200 years, including other Shias (the Fatimids), as well as Sunnis (the Abbasids and Seljuks) and Christians (the Crusaders) alike.

The English word assassin is derived from the Arabic word hashshashin, which shares etymological roots with the word hashish, supposedly referring to the order's tactics and a common but contested belief that many of their assassinations were carried out by individuals under the influence of the plant.

The two primary divisions were of the Persian Assassins in Alamut Castle and of the Levantine Assassins in Masyaf Castle. In 1253, the order began to collapse as a result of the Mongol campaign against the Nizaris. By 1256, the Assassin network had been defeated, but some independent Levantine strongholds continued to resist, prompting the Mongol army to begin massacring hundreds of thousands of Nizari Isma'ilis, largely destroying the religious community as a whole by the following year.

Contemporaneous historians of the Assassin period include ibn al-Qalanisi, Ali ibn al-Athir, and Ata-Malik Juvayni. The former two referred to the Assassins as batiniyya, an epithet widely accepted by Isma'ilis themselves.

== Overview ==
The Assassins were founded by Hassan-i Sabbah. The state was formed in 1090 after the capture of Alamut Castle in the Alborz mountain range of Persia, which served as the Assassins' headquarters. The Alamut and Lambsar castles became the foundation of a network of Isma'ili fortresses throughout Persia and Syria that formed the backbone of Assassin power, and included Syrian strongholds at Masyaf, Abu Qubays, al-Qadmus and al-Kahf. The Western world was introduced to the Assassins by the works of Marco Polo who understood the name as deriving from the word hashish. The Assassins posed a substantial strategic threat to Fatimid, Abbasid, and Seljuk authority. Over the course of nearly 200 years, they killed hundreds—including three caliphs, a ruler of Jerusalem and several Muslim and Christian leaders.

Notable victims of the Assassins include Janah ad-Dawla, emir of Homs, (1103), Mawdud ibn Altuntash, atabeg of Mosul (1113), Fatimid vizier Al-Afdal Shahanshah (1121), Seljuk atabeg Aqsunqur al-Bursuqi (1126), Fatimid caliph al-Amir bi-Ahkami'l-Lah (1130), Taj al-Mulk Buri, atabeg of Damascus (1132), and Abbasid caliphs al-Mustarshid (1135) and ar-Rashid (1138). Saladin, a major foe of the Assassins, twice escaped attempts on his life by the Assassins (1175–1176). The first Frank known to have been killed by the Assassins was Raymond II, Count of Tripoli, in 1152. The Assassins were acknowledged and feared by the Crusaders, losing the de facto King of Jerusalem, Conrad of Montferrat, to an Assassin's blade in 1192 and Lord Philip of Montfort of Tyre in 1270. The Ismaili Assassins were created to revive the Shi'a Ismaili Fatimid Caliphate in Egypt, which had been destroyed by the Sunni Seljuks.

Accounts of the Assassins were preserved within Western, Arabic, Syriac, and Persian sources where they are depicted as trained killers, responsible for the systematic elimination of opposing figures. European orientalists in the 19th and 20th centuries also referred to the Isma'ili Assassins in their works, writing about them based on accounts in seminal works by medieval Arab and Persian authors, particularly ibn al-Qalanisi's Mudhayyal Ta'rikh Dimashq (Continuation of the Chronicle of Damascus), ibn al-Athir's al-Kāmil fit-Tārīkh (The Complete History), and Juvayni's Tarīkh-i Jahān-gushā (History of the World Conqueror). The Order would finally come to an end during the rule of Imam Rukn al-Din Khurshah when the Isma'ili State was eventually destroyed as Khurshah surrendered the castles after the Mongol invasion of Persia. Khurshah died in 1256 and, by 1275, the Mongols had officially put an end to the Nizari state.

== History ==
=== Origins ===
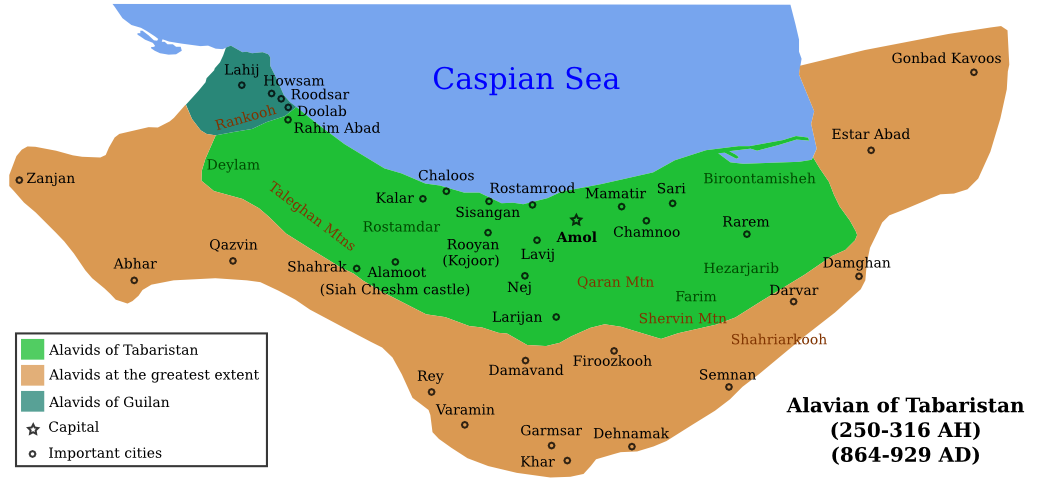
Map showing the Alamut area in Tabaristan region, modern day northern Iran.

Hassan-i Sabbah was born in Qom, ca. 1050, and did his religious studies in Cairo with the Fatimids. Sabbah's father was a Qahtanite Arab, said to be a descendant of Himyaritic kings, having emigrated to Qom from Kufa. He made his way to Persia where, through subterfuge, he and his followers captured Alamut Castle in 1090. Sabbah adapted the fortress to suit his needs not only for defense from hostile forces, but also for indoctrination of his followers. After laying claim to the fortress at Alamut, Sabbah began expanding his influence outwards to nearby towns and districts, using his agents to gain political favour and to intimidate the local populations. Spending most of his days at Alamut producing religious works and developing doctrines for his order, Sabbah would never again leave his fortress.

Shortly after establishing their headquarters at Alamut Castle, the sect captured Lambsar Castle, to be the largest of the Isma'ili fortresses and confirming the Assassins' power in northern Persia. The estimated date of the capture of Lambsar varies between 1096 and 1102. The castle was taken under the command of Kiya Buzurg Ummid, later Sabbah's successor, who remained commandant of the fortress for twenty years. No interactions between the Christian forces of the First Crusade and the Assassins have been noted, with the latter concentrating on the Muslim enemies of the former. Other than a mention of Tancred's 1106 taking of Apamea (see below) in Gesta Tancredi,

One of Sabbah's disciples named Dihdar Bu-Ali from Qazvin rallied local supporters to deflect the Seljuks. Their attack on Alamut Castle and surrounding areas was canceled upon the death of the sultan. The new sultan Berkyaruq, son of Malik Shah I, did not continue the direct attack on Alamut, concentrating on securing his position against rivals, including his half-brother Muhammad I Tapar, who eventually settled for a smaller role, becoming malik (translated as "king") in Armenia and Azerbaijan. Sabbah is reputed to have remarked, "the killing of this devil is the beginning of bliss". Of the 50 assassinations conducted during Sabbah's reign, more than half were Seljuk officials, many of whom supported Muhammad I Tapar.

The Assassins seized Persian castles of Rudkhan and Gerdkuh in 1096, before turning to Syria. Gerdkuh was re-fortified by Mu'ayyad al-Din Muzaffar ibn Ahmad Mustawfi, a Seljuk who was a secret Isma'ili convert, and his son Sharaf al-Din Muhammad. There they occupied the fortress at Shaizar held by the Banu Munqidh, using it to spread terror to Isfahan, the heart of the Seljuk Empire. A rebellion by the local population drove the Assassins out, but they continued to occupy a smaller fortress at Khalinjan. In 1097, Berkyaruq associate Bursuq was killed by Assassins.

By 1100, Berkyaruq had consolidated his power, and the Assassins increased their presence by infiltrating the sultan's court and army. Day-to-day functions of the court were frequently performed while armored and with weapons. The next year, he tasked his brother Ahmad Sanjar, then ruler of Khorasan, to attack Assassin strongholds in Quhistan. The siege at Tabas was at first successful, with the walls of the fortress breached, but then was lifted, possibly because the Seljuk commander had been bribed. The subsequent attack was devastating to the Assassins, but the terms granted were generous and they were soon reestablished at both Quhistan and Tabas. In the years following, the Assassins continued their mission against religious and secular leaders. Given these successes, they began expanding their operations into Syria.

=== Expansion into Syria ===
The first da'i Hassan-i dispatched to Syria was al-Hakim al-Munajjim, a Persian known as the physician-astrologer, establishing a cell in Aleppo in the early 12th century. Ridwan, the emir of Aleppo, was in search of allies and worked closely with al-Hakim. The alliance was first shown in the assassination in 1103 of Janah ad-Dawla, emir of Homs and a key opponent of Ridwan. He was murdered by three Assassins at the Great Mosque of al-Nuri in Homs. Al-Hakim died a few weeks later and was succeeded by Abu Tahir al-Sa'igh, a Persian known as the goldsmith.

While successful in cleaning the Assassins, they remained untouchable in their strongholds in the north. An eight-year war of attrition was initiated by the son of the first Assassin victim. The mission had some successes, negotiating a surrender of Khalinjan with local Assassin leader Ahmad ibn 'Abd al-Malik ibn Attāsh, with the occupants allowed to go to Tabas and Arrajan. During the siege of Alamut, a famine resulted and Hassan had his wife and daughters sent to the fortress at Gerdkuh. After that time, Assassins never allowed their women to be at their fortresses during military campaigns, both for protection and secrecy. In the end, ibn Attāsh did not fulfill his commitment and was flayed alive, his head delivered to the sultan.

In Syria, Abu Tahir al-Sa'igh, Ridwan and Abu'l Fath of Sarmin conspired in 1106 to send a team of Assassins to murder Khalaf ibn Mula'ib, emir of Apamea (Qalaat al-Madiq). Some of Khalaf's sons and guards were also killed and, after the murder, Ridwan became overlord of Apamea and its fortress Qal'at al-Madiq, with Abu'l Fath as emir. A surviving son of Khalaf escaped and turned to Tancred, who was at first content to leave the city in the hands of the Isma'ilis and simply collect tribute. Later, he returned and captured the city for Antioch, as the town's residents overwhelmingly approved of Frankish rule. Abu'l Fath was tortured to death, while Abu Tahir ransomed himself and returned to Aleppo. This encounter, the first between the Crusaders and the Assassins, did not deter the latter from their prime mission against the Seljuks.

Not so lucky were Ubayd Allah al-Khatib, qadi of Isfahan, and a qadi of Nishapur, both of whom succumbed to the Assassins' blade.

The Assassins wreaked havoc on the Syrian rulers, with their first major kill being that of Mawdud, atabeg of Mosul, in 1113. Mawdud was felled by Assassins in Damascus while a guest of Toghtekin, atabeg of Damascus. He was replaced at Mosul by al-Bursuqi, who himself would be a victim of the Assassins in 1126. Toghtekin's son, the great Buri, founder of the Burid dynasty, would fall victim to the Assassins in 1131, dying a year later due to his injuries.

Ridwan died in 1113 and was succeeded as ruler of Aleppo by his son Alp Arslan al-Akhras. Alp Arslan continued his father's conciliatory approach to the Assassins. A warning from Muhammad I Tapar and a prior attempt of the assassination of Abu Harb Isa ibn Zayd, a wealthy Persian merchant, led to a wholescale expulsion of the Assassins from Aleppo in that same year. Led by militia commander Sāʿid ibn Badī, the attack resulted in the execution of Abu Tahir al-Sa'igh and the brother of al-Hakim al-Munajjim, with 200 other Assassins killed or imprisoned, some thrown from the top of the citadel. Many took refuge with the Banu Munqidh at Shaizar. Revenge was slow but sure, taken out on Sāʿid ibn Badī in 1119. The shiftless Arp Arslan had exiled Sāʿid to Qalʿat Jaʿbar, where he was murdered along with two of his sons by Assassins.

The Assassins struck again in Damascus in 1116. While a guest of Toghtekin's, Kurdish emir Ahmad-Il ibn Ibrāhim ibn Wahsūdān was sitting next to his host when a grieving man approached with a petition he wished be conveyed to Muhammad I Tapar. When Ahmad-Il accepted the document, he was stuck with a dagger, then again and again by a second and third accomplice. It was thought that the real target may have been Toghtekin, but the attackers were discovered to be Assassins, likely after Ahmad-Il, the foster brother of sultan.

In 1118, Muhammad I Tapar died and his brother Ahmad Sanjar became Seljuk sultan, and Hassan sent ambassadors to seek peace. When Sanjar rebuffed these ambassadors, Hassan then sent his Assassins to the sultan. Sanjar woke up one morning with a dagger stuck in the ground beside his bed. Alarmed, he kept the matter a secret. A messenger from Hassan arrived and stated, "Did I not wish the sultan well that the dagger which was struck in the hard ground would have been planted on your soft breast". For the next several decades there ensued a ceasefire between the Isma'ilis and the Seljuks. Sanjar himself pensioned the Assassins on taxes collected from the lands they owned, gave them grants and licenses, and even allowed them to collect tolls from travelers.

By 1120, the Assassins' position in Aleppo had improved to the point that they demanded the small citadel of Qal'at ash-Sharif from Ilghazi, then Artuqid emir of Aleppo. Rather than refuse, he had the citadel demolished. The Assassins' influence in Aleppo came to an end in 1124 when they were expelled by Belek Ghazi, a successor to Ilghazi. Nevertheless, the qadi ibn al-Khashahab who had overseen the demolition of Qal'at ash-Sharif was killed by Assassins in 1125. At the same time, the Assassins of Diyarbakir were set upon by the locals, resulting in hundreds killed.

In 1121, Al-Afdal Shahanshah, the vizier of the Fatimid Caliphate, was murdered by three Assassins from Aleppo, causing a seven-day celebration among the Isma'ilis and no great mourning among the court of Fatimid caliph al-Amir bi-Ahkam Allah who resented his growing boldness. Al-Afdal Shahanshah was replaced as vizier by al-Ma'mum al-Bata'ihi who was instructed to prepare a letter of rapprochement between Cairo and Alamut. Upon learning of a plot to kill both al-Amir and al-Ma'mum, such ideas were disbanded, and severe restrictions on dealing with the Assassins were instead put in place.

=== Post-succession period ===
In 1124, Hassan-i Sabbah died, leaving a legacy that reverberated throughout the Middle East for centuries. He was succeeded at Alamut by Kiya Buzurg Ummid.

The appointment of a new da'i at Alamut may have led the Seljuks to believe the Assassins were in a weakened position, and Ahmad Sanjar launched an attack on them in 1126. Led by Sanjar's vizier Mu'in ad-Din Kashi, the Seljuks again struck at Quhistan and Nishapur in the east, and at Rudbar to the north. In the east, the Seljuks had minor successes at a village near Sabzevar, where the population was destroyed, their leader leaping from the mosque's minaret, and at Turaythirth in Nishapur, where the attackers "killed many, took much booty, and then returned." At best, the results were not decisive, but superior to the routing the Seljuks received in the north, with one expedition driven back, losing their previous booty, and another having a Seljuk commander captured. In the end, the Isma'ili position was better than before the offensive. In the guise of a peace offering of two Arabian horses, Assassins gained the confidence of Mu'in ad-Din Kashi and killed him in 1127.

At the same time, in Syria, a Persian named Bahram al-Da'i, the successor to Abu Tahir al-Sa'igh who had been executed in Aleppo in 1113, appeared in Damascus reflecting cooperation between the Assassins and Toghtekin, including a joint operation against the Crusaders. Bahram, a Persian from Asterabad (present-day Gorgan), had lived in secrecy after the expulsion of the Assassins from Aleppo and was the nephew of the Assassin Abu Ibrahim al-Asterbadi who had been executed by Berkyaruq in 1101. Bahram was most likely behind the murder of al-Bursuqi in 1126, whose assassination may have been ordered by the Seljuk sultan Mahmud II. He later established a stronghold near Banias. During an attack on the Lebanese valley of Wadi al-Taym, Bahram captured and tortured to death a local chieftain named Baraq ibn Jandal. In retaliation, his brother Dahhak ibn Jandal killed Bahram in 1127. So great was the fear and hatred of the Assassins that the messenger delivering Bahram's head and hands to Cairo was rewarded with a robe of honor. That fear was justified as caliph al-Amir bi-Ahkam Allah was murdered at court in 1130 by ten Assassins.

The Isma'ili response to the Seljuk invasion of 1126 was multi-faceted. In Rudbar, a new and powerful fortress was built at Maymundiz and new territories acquired. To the east, the Seljuk stronghold of Sistan was raided in 1129. That same year, Mahmud II, son of Muhammad I Tapar, and sultan of Isfahan, decided to sue for peace with Alamut. Unfortunately, the Isma'ili envoys to Mahmud II were lynched by an angry mob following their audience with the sultan. The demand by Kiya Buzurg Ummid for punishment of the perpetrators was refused. That prompted an Assassin attack on Qazvin, resulting in the loss of 400 lives in addition to a Turkish emir. A counterattack on Alamut was inconclusive.

In Syria, Assassin leader Bahram was replaced by another mysterious Persian named Isma'il al-'Ajami who, like Bahram, was supported by al-Mazdaghani, the pro-Isma'ili vizier to Toghtekin. After the death of Toghtekin in 1128, his son and successor Taj a-Mulk Buri began working to free Damascus of the Assassins, supported by his military commander Yusuf ibn Firuz. al-Mazdaghani was murdered and his head publicly displayed. The Damascenes turned on the Assassins, leaving "dogs yelping and quarreling over their limbs and corpses." At least 6000 Assassins died, and the rest, including Isma'il (who had turned Banias over to the Franks), fled to Frankish territory. Isma'il was killed in 1130, temporarily disabling the Assassins' Syrian mission. Nevertheless, Alamut organized a counterstrike, with two Persian Assassins disguised as Turkish soldiers striking down Buri in 1131. The Assassins were hacked to pieces by Buri's guards, but Buri died of his wounds the following year.

Mahmud II died in 1131 and his brother Ghiyath ad-Din Mas'ud (Mas'ud) was recognized as successor by Abbasid caliph al-Mustarshid. The succession was contested by Mahmud's son and other brothers, and al-Mustarshid was drawn into the conflict. The caliph al-Mustarshid was taken prisoner by Seljuk forces in 1135 near Hamadan and pardoned with the proviso that he abdicate. Left in his tent studying the Quran, he was murdered by a large group of Assassins. Some suspected Mas'ud and even Ahmad Sanjar with complicity, but the chronicles of contemporaneous Arab historians ibn al-Athir and ibn al-Jawzi do not bear that out. The Isma'ilis commemorated the caliph's death with seven days and nights of celebration.

The reign of Buzurg Ummid ended with his death in 1138, showing a relatively small list of assassinations. He was succeeded by his son Muhammad Buzurg Ummid, sometimes referred to as Kiya Muhammad.

The Abbasids' celebration of the death of the Assassin leader Buzurg Ummid was short-lived. The son and successor of the last high-profile victim of the Assassins, al-Mustarshid, was ar-Rashid. Ar-Rashid was deposed by his uncle al-Muqtafi in 1136 and, while recovering from an illness in Isfahan, was murdered by Assassins. The addition of a second caliph to the Assassins' so-called "roll of honor" of victims again resulted in a week of celebration at Alamut. Another significant success was the assassination of the son of Mahmud II, Da'ud, who ruled in Azerbaijan and Jibal. Da'ud was felled by four Assassins in Tabriz in 1143, rumored to have been dispatched by Zengi, atabeg of Mosul.

=== Expansion in Syria ===
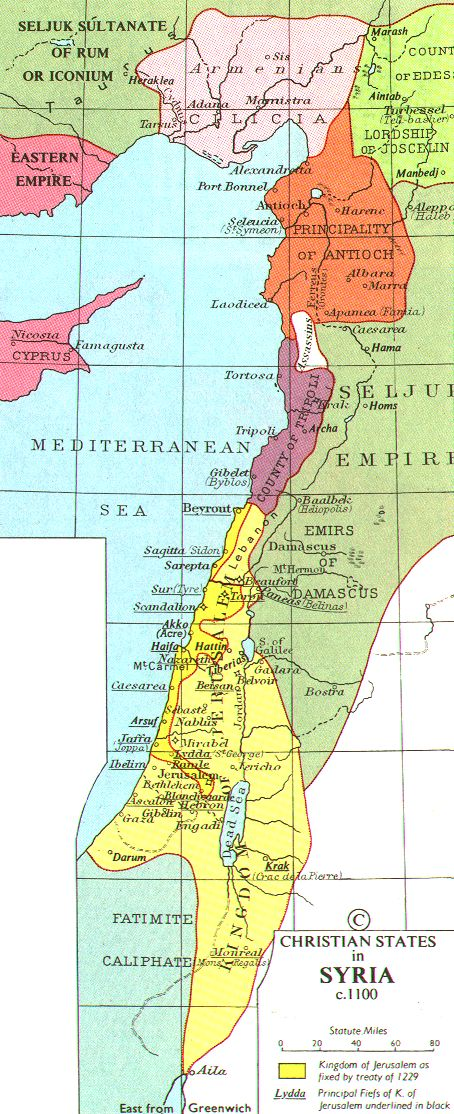
Map of the crusader states, showing the area controlled by the Assassins around Masyaf, slightly above the center, in white

The decades after the assassination of al-Mustarshid showed an expansion of Assassin castles in Jabal Bahrā', to the northwest of their Syrian fortresses in Jabal as-Summaq. In 1132, Saif al-Mulk ibn Amrun, emir of al-Kahf, recovered the fortress of al-Qadmus from the Franks, known to them as Bokabeis. He then sold the fortress to the Assassins in 1133. This was followed by the ceding of al-Kahf Castle itself to Assassin control in 1138 by Saif's son Musa in the midst of a succession struggle. These were followed by the acquisition of the castle at Masyaf in 1140 and of Qala'at al-Khawabi, known to the Crusaders as La Coible, in 1141.

Relatively little is recorded concerning Assassin activity during this period until the Second Crusade. In 1149, an Assassin named Ali ibn-Wafa allied with Raymond of Poitiers, son of William IX of Aquitaine, to defend the borders of the Principality of Antioch against Zengid expansion. The forces met at the battle of Inab, with Zengi's son and heir Nur ad-Din defeating the Franks, killing both Raymond and ibn-Wafa. Nur ad-Din would again foil the Assassins in 1158, incorporating a castle at Shaizar that they had occupied after the 1157 earthquake into his territory. Two assassinations are known from this period. In a revenge attack, Dahhak ibn Jandal, the Wadi al-Taym chieftain who had killed Assassin da'i Bahram in 1127, died from an Assassin's blade in 1149. A few years later in 1152, possibly in retaliation to the establishment of the Knights Templar at Tartus, Raymond II, count of Tripoli, was killed by Assassins. This marked the first known Christian victim.

=== Hassan II and Rashid ad-Din Sinan ===
The fourteen known assassinations during the reign of Kiya Muhammad were a far cry from the tally of his predecessors, representing a significant decline in the power of the Isma'ilis. This was exemplified by the governors of Mazandaran and of Rayy who were said to have built towers out of Isma'ili skulls.

In the middle of Ramadan in 559 AH, Hassan II gathered his followers and announced to "jinn, men and angels" that the Hidden Imam had freed them "from the burden of the rules of Holy Law". With that, the assembled took part in a ritual violation of Sharia, a banquet with wine, in violation of the Ramadan fast, with their backs turned towards Medina. Observance of Islamic rites (fasting, salat prayer, etc.) was punishable by the utmost severity. (According to Shīʿa hadiths, when the Hidden Imam/mahdi reappears, "he will bring a new religion, a new book and a new law"). Resistance was nonetheless deep, and Hasan was stabbed to death by his own brother-in-law.

Hassan II shifted the focus of his followers from the exoteric to the esoteric (batin). He abrogated the exoteric practice of Sharia and stressed on the esoteric (batini) side of the laws. And "while outwardly he was known as the grandson of Buzurgumid", in this esoteric reality, Lewis writes, Hasan claimed "he was the Imam of the time" (the last Imam of Shia Islam before the end of the world). The impact of these changes on Isma'ili life and politics was vast and continued after Hassan II's death in 1166 by his son Nūr al-Dīn Muhammad, known as the Imam Muhammad II, who ruled from 1166 to 1210. It is in this context and the changes in the Muslim world brought about by the disintegration of the Seljuk empire that a new chief da'i of the Assassins was thrust: Rashid ad-Din Sinan, referred to as Sinān.

Rashid ad-Din Sinan, an alchemist and schoolmaster, was dispatched to Syria by Hassan II as a messenger of his Islamic views and to continue the Assassins' mission. Known as the greatest of the Assassin chiefs, Sinān first made headquarters at al-Kahf Castle and then the fortress of Masyaf. At al-Kahf, he worked with chief da'i Abu-Muhammad, who was succeeded at his death by Khwaja Ali ibn Mas'ud without authority from Alamut. Khwaja was murdered by Abu-Muhammad's nephew Abu Mansur, causing Alamut to reassert control. After seven years at al-Kahf, Sinān assumed that role, operating independently of and feared by Alamut, relocating the capital to Masyaf. Among his first tasks were the refurbishing of the fortress of ar-Rusafa and of Qala'at al-Khawabi, constructing a tower at the citadel of the latter. Sinān also captured the castle of al-'Ullaiqah at Aleika, near Tartus.

One of the first orders of business that Sinān confronted was the continuing threat from Nur ad-Din as well as the Knights Templar's presence at Tartus. In 1173, Sinān proposed to Amalric of Jerusalem an alliance against Nur ad-Din in exchange for the cancellation of the tribute imposed upon Assassin villages near Tartus. The Assassin envoys to the king were ambushed and slain by a Templar knight named Walter du Mesnil near Tripoli while returning from the negotiations, an act apparently sanctioned by the Templar Grand Master Odo de Saint Amand. Amalric demanded that the knight be surrendered, but Odo refused, claiming only the pope had the authority to punish du Mesnil. Amalric had du Mesnil kidnapped and imprisoned at Tyre. Sinān accepted the king's apology, assured that justice had been done. The point of the alliance became moot as both Nur ad-Din and Amalric died of natural causes soon thereafter.

These developments could not have been better for Saladin who wished to expand beyond Egypt into Jerusalem and Syria, first taking Damascus. With the Kingdom of Jerusalem being led by the 13-year old leperous Baldwin IV and Syria by the 11-year old as-Salih Ismail al-Malik, son of Nur ad-Din, he continued his campaign in Syria, moving against Aleppo. While besieging Aleppo in late 1174 or early 1175, the camp of Saladin was infiltrated by Assassins sent by Sinān and As-Salih's regent Gümüshtigin. Nasih al-Din Khumartekin, emir of Abu Qubays, was killed in the attack which left Saladin unscathed. The next year, after taking Azaz, the Assassins again struck, wounding Saladin. Gümüshtigin was again believed to be complicit in the assassination attempt. Turning his attention to Aleppo, the city was soon conquered, and Saladin allowed as-Salih and Gümüshtigin to continue to rule, but under his sovereignty. Saladin then turned his attention back to the Assassins, besieging Masyaf in 1176. Failing to capture the stronghold, he settled for a truce. Accounts of a mystical encounter between Saladin and Sinān have been offered :

Saladin had his guards supplied with link lights and had chalk and cinders strewed around his tent outside Masyaf—which he was besieging—to detect any footsteps by the Assassins. According to this version, one night Saladin's guards noticed a spark glowing down the hill of Masyaf and then vanishing among the Ayyubid tents. Presently, Saladin awoke to find a figure leaving the tent. He saw that the lamps were displaced and beside his bed laid hot scones of the shape peculiar to the Assassins with a note at the top pinned by a poisoned dagger. The note threatened that he would be killed if he did not withdraw from his assault. Saladin gave a loud cry, exclaiming that Sinan himself was the figure that had left the tent.

Another version claims that Saladin hastily withdrew his troops from Masyaf because they were urgently needed to fend off a Crusader force in the vicinity of Mount Lebanon. In reality, Saladin sought to form an alliance with Sinan and his Assassins, consequently depriving the Crusaders of a potent ally against him. Viewing the expulsion of the Crusaders as a mutual benefit and priority, Saladin and Sinan maintained cooperative relations afterwards, the latter dispatching contingents of his forces to bolster Saladin's army in a number of decisive subsequent battlefronts.

By 1177, the conflict between Sinān and as-Salih continued with the assassination of Shihab ad-Din abu-Salih, vizier to both as-Salih and Nur ad-Din. A letter from as-Salih to Sinān requesting the murder was found to be a forgery by Gümüshtigin, causing his removal. As-Salih seized the village of al-Hajira from the Assassins, and in response Sinān's followers burned the marketplace in Aleppo.

In 1190, Isabella I was Queen of Jerusalem and the Third Crusade had just begun. The daughter of Amalric, she married her first husband Conrad of Montferrat, who became king by virtue of marriage, not yet crowned. Conrad was of royal blood, the cousin of Holy Roman Emperor Frederick Barbarossa and Louis VII of France. Conrad had been in charge of Tyre during the siege of Tyre in 1187 launched by Saladin, successfully defending the city. Guy of Lusignan, married to Isabella's half-sister Sybilla of Jerusalem, was king of Jerusalem by right of marriage and had been captured by Saladin during the battle of Hattin in that same year, 1187. When Guy was released in 1188, he was denied entry to Tyre by Conrad and launched the siege of Acre in 1189. Queen Sybilla died of an epidemic sweeping her husband's military camp in 1190, negating Guy's claim to the throne and resulting in Isabella becoming queen.

Assassins disguised as Christian monks had infiltrated the bishopric of Tyre, gaining the confidence of both the archbishop Joscius and Conrad of Montferrat. There in 1192, they stabbed Conrad to death. The surviving Assassin is reputed to have named Richard I of England as the instigator, who had much to gain as demonstrated by the rapidity at which the widow married Henry II of Champagne. That account is disputed by ibn al-Athir who names Saladin in a plot with Sinān to kill both Conrad and Richard. Richard I was captured by Leopold V, Duke of Austria, and held by Henry VI, who had become Holy Roman Emperor in 1191, accused of murder. Sinān wrote to Leopold V absolving Richard I of complicity in the plot. Regardless, Richard I was released in 1194 after England paid his ransom and the murder remains unsolved. Adding to the continued cold case is the belief by modern historians that Sinan's letter to Leopold V is a forgery, written by members of Richard I's administration.

Conrad was Sinān's last assassination. The great Assassin Rashid ad-Din Sinan, the Old Man of the Mountain, died in 1193, the same year that claimed Saladin. He died of natural causes at al-Kahf Castle and was buried at Salamiyah, which had been a secret hub of Isma'ili activity in the 9th and 10th centuries. His successor was Nasr al-'Ajami, under the control of Alamut, who reportedly met with emperor Henry VI in 1194. Later successors through 1227 included Kamāl ad-Din al-Hasan and Majd ad-Din, again under the control of Alamut. Saladin left his Ayyubid dynasty under his sons al-Aziz Uthman, sultan of Egypt, al-Afdal ibn Salah ad-Din, emir of Damascus, and az-Zahir Ghazi, emir of Aleppo. Al-Aziz died soon thereafter, replaced by Saladin's brother al-Adil I.

=== 13th century ===
In 1210, Muhammad III died and his son Jalāl al-Din Hasan (known as Hassan III) became Imam of the Isma'ili State. His first actions included the return to the Islamic orthodoxy by practising Taqiyyah to ensure safety of the Ismailis in the hostile environment. He claimed allegiance to the Sunnis to protect himself and his followers from further persecution. He had a Sunni mother and four Sunni wives. Hassan III recognized the Abbasid caliph al-Nasir who in turn granted a diploma of investiture. The Alamuts had a previous history with al-Nasir, supplying Assassins to attack a Kwarezm representative of shah Ala ad-Din Tekish, but that was more of an action of convenience than formal alliance. Maintaining ties to western Christian influences, the Alamuts became tributaries to the Knights Hospitaller beginning at the Isma'ili stronghold Abu Qubays, near Margat.

The count of Tripoli in 1213 was Bohemond IV, the fourth prince of Antioch of that name. That year his 18-year-old son Raymond, namesake of his grandfather, was murdered by the Assassins under Nasr al-'Ajami while at church in Tartus. Suspecting both Assassin and Hospitaller involvement, Bohemond and the Knights Templar laid siege to Qala'at al-Khawabi, an Isma'ili stronghold near Tartus. Appealing to the Ayyubids for help, az-Zahir Ghazi dispatched a relief force from Aleppo. His forces were nearly destroyed at Jabal Bahra. Az-Zahir's uncle al-Adil I, emir of Damascus, responded and the Franks ended the siege by 1216. Bohemond IV would again fight the Ayyubids in the Fifth Crusade.

Majd ad-Din was the new chief da'i in Syria in 1220, assuming that role from Kamāl ad-Din al-Hasan of whom very little is known. At that time the Seljuk sultanate of Rûm paid an annual tribute to Alamut, and Majd ad-Din notified the sultan Kayqubad I that henceforth the tribute was to be paid to him. Kayqubad I requested clarification from Hassan III who informed him that the monies had indeed been assigned to Syria.

Hassan III died in 1221, likely from poisoning. He was succeeded by his 9-year-old son Imam 'Alā ad-Din Muhammad, known as Muhammad III, and was the penultimate Isma'ili ruler of Alamut before the Mongol conquest. Because of his age, Hassan's vizier served as regent to the young Imam, and put Hassan's wives and sister to death for the suspected poisoning. Muhammad III reversed the Sunni course his father had set, returning to Shi'ite orthodoxy. His attempts to accommodate the advancing Mongols failed.

In 1225, Frederick II was Holy Roman Emperor, a position his father Henry VI had held until 1197. He had committed to prosecuting the Sixth Crusade and married the heiress to the Kingdom of Jerusalem, Isabella II. The next year, the once and future king sent envoys to Majd ad-Din with significant gifts for the imam to ensure his safe passage. Khwarezm had collapsed under the Mongols, but many of the Kwarezmians still operated as mercenaries in northern Iraq. Under the pretense that the road to Alamut was unsafe due to these mercenaries, Majd ad-Din kept the gifts for himself, and provided the safe passage. As a precaution, Majd ad-Din informed al-Aziz Muhammad, emir of Aleppo and son of az-Zahir Ghazi, of the emperor's embassy. In the end, Frederick did not complete that trip to the Holy Land due to illness, being excommunicated in 1227. The Knights Hospitaller were not as accommodating as Alamut, demanding their share of the tribute. When Majd ad-Din refused, the Hospitallers attacked and carried off the majority of the booty. Majd ad-Din was succeeded by Sirāj ad-Din Muzaffa ibn al-Husain in 1227, serving as chief da'i until 1239.

Taj ad-Din Abu'l-Futūh ibn Muhammad was chief da'i in Syria in 1239, succeeding Sirāj ad-Din Muzaffa. At this point, the Assassins were an integral part of Syrian politics. The Arab historian Ibn Wasil had a friendship with Taj ad-Din and writes of Badr ad-Din, qadi of Sinjar, who sought refuge with Taj ad-Din to escape the wrath of Egyptian Ayyubid ruler as-Salih Ayyub. Taj ad-Din served until at least 1249 when he was replaced by Radi ad-Din Abu'l-Ma'āli.

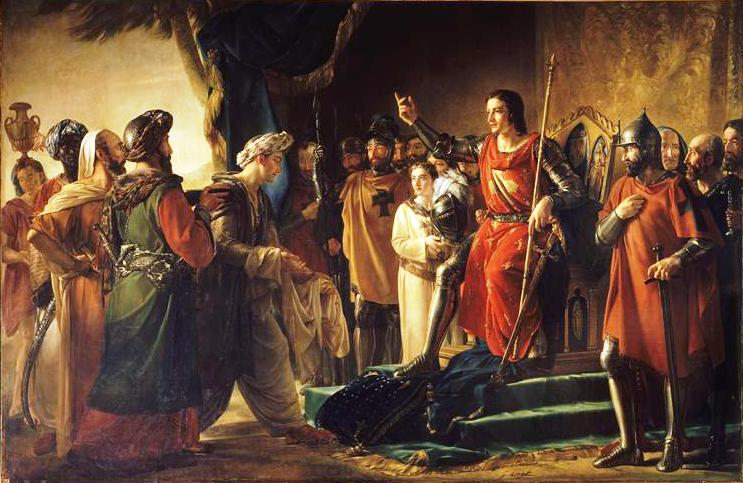
Saint Louis receiving the envoy of the Old Man of the Mountain. Painting by Georges Rouget in 1819.

In that same year, Louis IX of France embarked on the Seventh Crusade in Egypt. He captured the port of Damietta from the aging al-Salih Ayyub which he refused to turn over to Conrad II, who had inherited the throne of Jerusalem from his parents Frederick II and Isabella II. The Frankish Crusaders were soundly defeated by Abu Futuh Baibars, then a commander in the Egyptian army, at the battle of al-Mansurah in 1250. Saint Louis, as Louis IX was known, was captured by the Egyptians and, after a handsome reward was paid, spent four years in Acre, Caesarea and Jaffa. One of the captives with Louis was Jean de Joinville, biographer of the king, who reported the interaction of the monarch with the Assassins. While at Acre, emissaries of Radi ad-Din Abu'l-Ma'āli met with him, demanding a tribute be paid to their chief "as the emperor of Germany, the king of Hungary, the sultan of Egypt and the others because they know well they can only live as long as it please him." Alternately, the king could pay the tribute the Assassins paid the Templars and Hospitallers. Later the king's Arabic interpreter Yves the Breton met personally with Radi ad-Din and discussed the respective beliefs. Afterwards, the chief da'i went riding, with his valet proclaiming: "Make way before him who bears the death of kings in his hands!"

The Egyptian victory at al-Mansurah led to the establishment of the Mamluk dynasty in Egypt. Muhammad III was murdered in 1255 and replaced by his son Rukn al-Din Khurshah, the last Imam to rule Alamut. Najm ad-Din later became chief da'i of the Assassins in Syria, the last to be associated with Alamut. Louis IX returned to north Africa during the Eighth Crusade where he died of natural causes in Tunis.

=== Downfall and aftermath ===
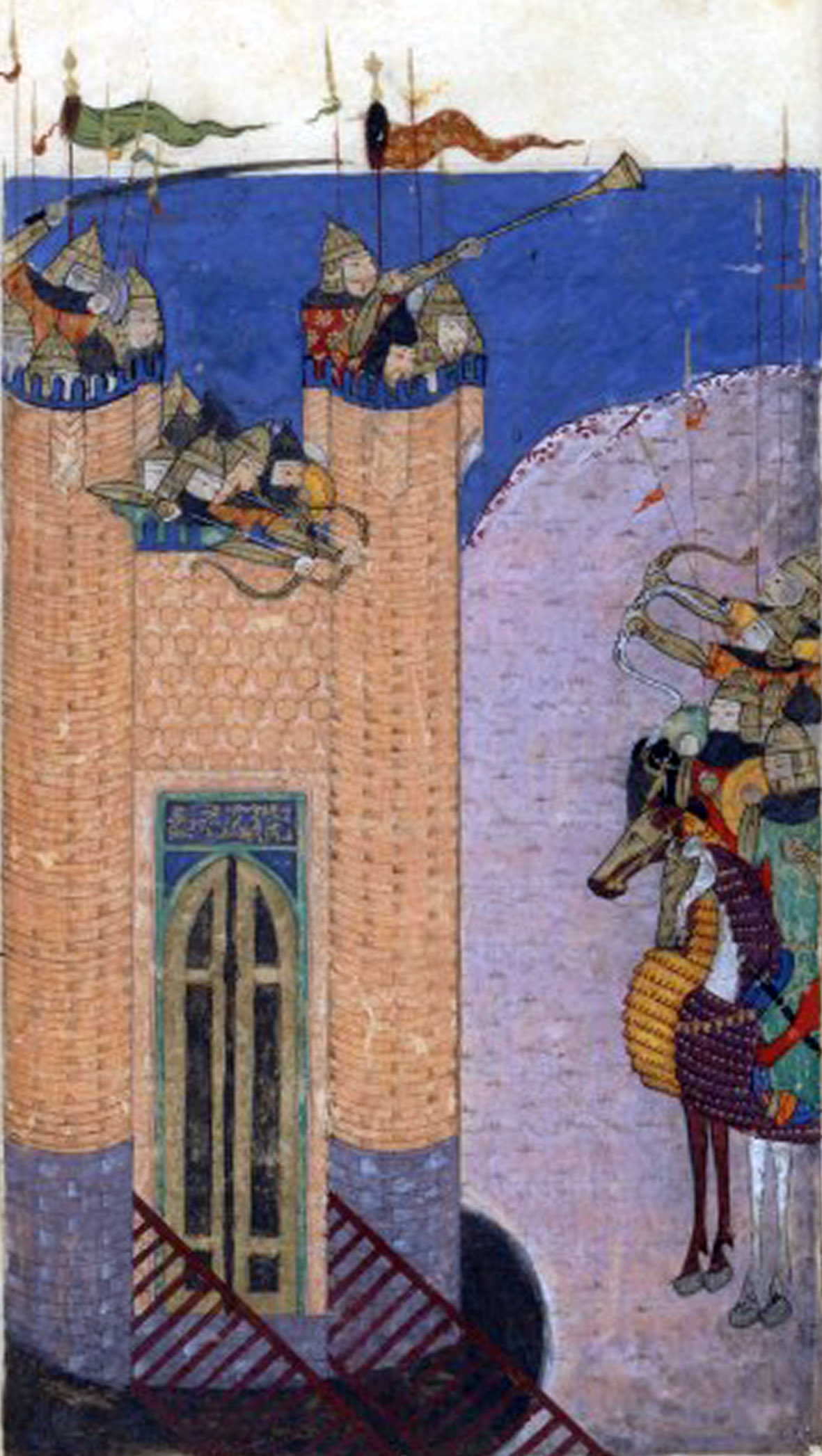
View of the city of Alamut being besieged. 1438 depiction by the Tarikh-i Jahangushay

The Assassins suffered a significant blow at the hands of the Mongol Empire during the well-documented invasion of Khwarazm. A decree was handed over to the Mongol commander Kitbuqa who began to assault several Assassin fortresses in 1253 before Hulagu's advance in 1256. During the siege of Maymun-Diz, the last Ismaili Imam capitulated to the Mongols. The Imam ordered his subordinates to surrender and demolish their fortresses likewise. The subsequent capitulation of the symbolic stronghold of Alamut marked the end of the Nizari state in Persia. Lambsar fell in 1257, Masyaf in 1267. The Assassins recaptured and held Alamut for a few months in 1275, but they were crushed and their political power was lost forever. Rukn al-Din Khurshah was put to death shortly thereafter. Some strongholds continued to resist for many years, notably Gerdkuh.

Though the Mongol massacre at Alamut was widely interpreted to be the end of Isma'ili influence in the region, various sources say that the Isma'ilis' political influence continued. In 1275, a son of Imam Rukn al-Din Khurshah managed to recapture Alamut, though only for a few years. Isma'ili political activity in the region also seems to have continued under the leadership of Sultan Muhammad b. Jahangir and his son, until the latter's execution in 1597.

In Syria, the Assassins joined with other Muslim groups to oppose the Mongols and courted the Mamluks and Baibars. Baibars entered into a truce with the Hospitallers in 1266 and stipulated that the tribute paid by the Assassins be halted. The tribute once paid to the Franks was to come instead to Cairo. As early as 1260, Baibars' biographer ibn Abd al-Zahir reported that he was granting Assassin lands in iqta' to his generals, and in 1265 began to tax the "gifts" the Assassins received from various princes that apparently included Louis IX of France, Rudolph I of Germany, Alphonso X of Castile, and the Rasulid sultan of Yemen al-Muzaffar Yusuf. The Syrian branch of the Assassins was taken over by Baibars by 1270, recognizing the threat of an independent force with his sultanate.

Najm ad-Din was replaced by Baibars' son-in-law Sarim al-Din Mubarak, governor of al-'Ullaiqah in 1270. Sarim was soon deposed and sent as a prisoner to Cairo, and Najm ad-Din was restored at chief da'i at Masyaf. His son Shams ad-Din joined him in service, but owing a tribute to the sultan. The next year, in the midst of the siege of Tripoli, two Assassins were sent by Bohemond VI of Antioch, then Count of Tripoli, to murder his attacker Baibars. Shams ad-Din was arrested in the plot, but released when his father argued his case. The Isma'ili leaders were eventually implicated and agreed to surrender their castles and live at Baibars' court. Najm ad-Din died in Cairo in 1274.

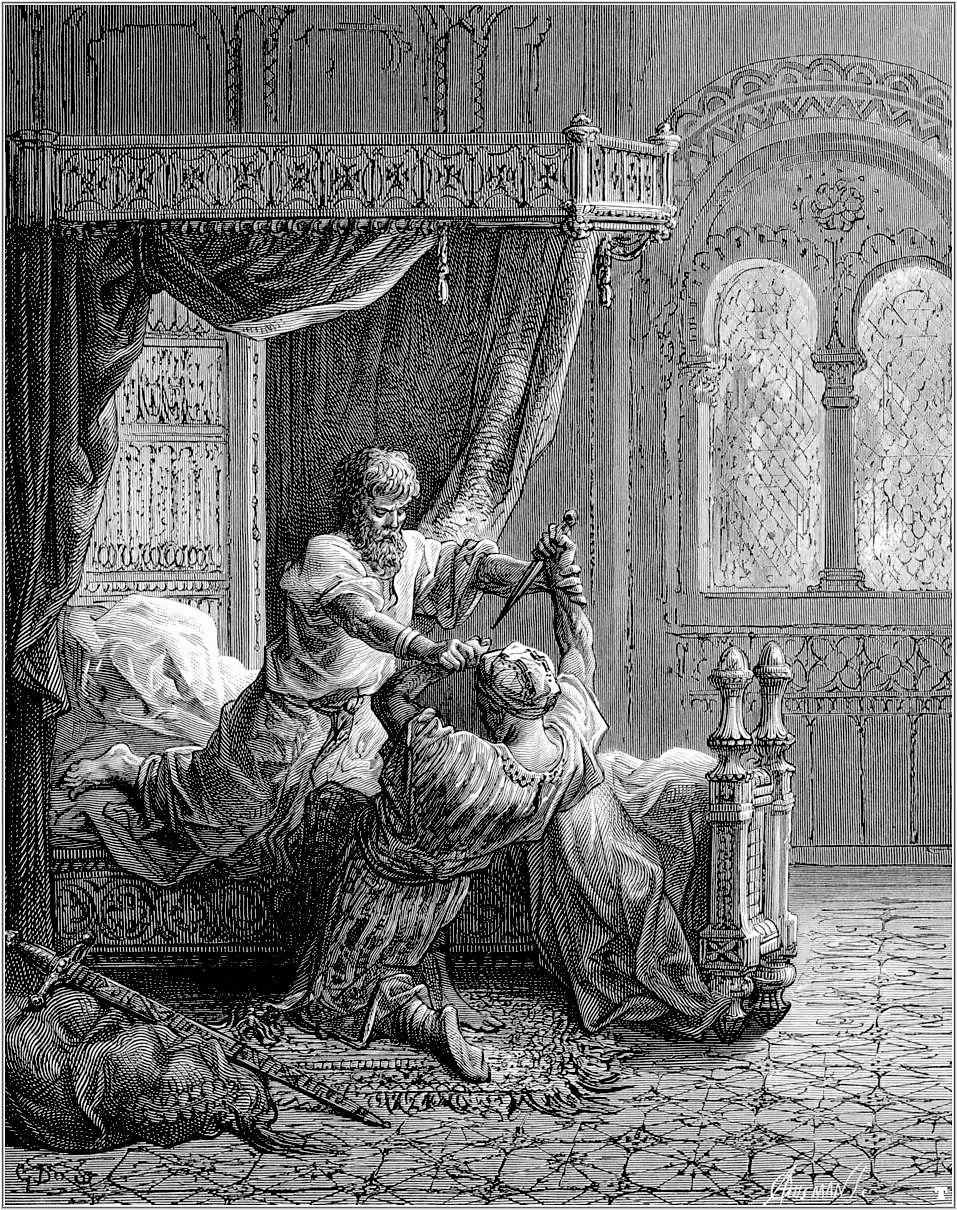
Edward I, King of England thwarts an attempt on his life by an Assassin and kills the attacker. The assassin likely was sent by the Mamluk Sultan Baibars, in order to remove his opposition to a 10-year truce with the Christian states at Jerusalem. 19th-century depiction by Gustave Doré

In 1271, Baibars' forces seized al-'Ullaiqah and ar-Rusafa, after taking Masyaf the year before. Later in the year, Shams ad-Din surrendered and was deported to Egypt. Qala'at al-Khawabi fell that year and within two years Gerdkuh and all of the Assassin fortresses were held by the sultan. With the Assassins under his control, Baibars was able to use them to counter the forces arriving in the Ninth Crusade. The sultan threatened Bohemond VI, and the Assassins attacked future king Edward I of England unsuccessfully, with Edward killing the Assassin.

The last known victim of the Assassins was Philip of Montfort, lord of Tyre, long an enemy of Baibars. Philip helped negotiate the truce following the capture of Damietta by Louis IX and had lost the castle at Toron to Baibars in 1266. Despite his advanced age, Philip was murdered by Baibars' Assassins in 1270.

The last of the Assassin strongholds was al-Kahf in the Syrian coastal mountains in 1273. The Mamluks reportedly continued to use the services of the remaining Assassins, and the 14th-century scholar ibn Battuta reported their fixed rate of pay per murder, with his children getting the fee if the Assassin did not survive the attack. There are, nevertheless, no recorded instances of Assassin activity after the later 13th century. They unremarkably settled near Salamiyah, with a still-large Isma'ili population that recognizes the Aga Khan as their Imam.

== Etymology ==
The name "Assassin" is often said to derive from the Arabic word Hashishin or "users of hashish", which was originally applied to the Assassins Isma'ilis by the rival Mustali Isma'ilis during the fall of the Isma'ili Fatimid Empire and the separation of the two Isma'ili streams. There is little evidence hashish was used to motivate the Assassins, contrary to the beliefs of their Medieval enemies. It is possible that the term hashishiyya or hashishi in Arabic sources was used metaphorically in its abusive sense relating to use of hashish, which due to its effects on the mind state is outlawed in Islam. The term hashashin was (and still is) used to describe absent-minded criminals and is used derogatorily in all the Muslim sources referring to the Assassins as such.

The Sunni Muslims also used the term mulhid to refer to the Assassins, which is also recorded by the traveller and Franciscan William of Rubruck as mulidet.

The Assassins were first linked to the Arabic word hashish by the 19th-century orientalist Silvestre de Sacy, who noted their variants assassin and assissini. Citing the example of one of the first written applications of the Arabic term hashish to the Ismailis by 13th-century historian Abu Shama, de Sacy demonstrated its connection to the name given to the Ismailis throughout Western scholarship. Following de Sacy's account, various popularizers of the "Hashishi myth" – including self-proclaimed Sufi scholar Idries Shah (who, in fact, never belonged to any Sufi tariqa nor even graduated from any university) – continue to pejoratively describe the Assassins (and, by extension, Ismailis in general) as 'druggers' who used hashish "in stupefying candidates for the ephemeral visit to paradise". However, the first known usage of the term hashishi has been traced back to 1122 when the Fatimid caliph al-Amir bi-Ahkami'l-Lah, himself later assassinated, employed it in derogatory reference to the Syrian. Used figuratively, the term hashishi connoted meanings such as outcasts or rabble. Without actually accusing the group of using the hashish drug, the caliph used the term in a pejorative manner. This label was quickly adopted by anti-Isma'ili historians and applied to the Isma'ilis of Syria and Persia. The spread of the term was further facilitated through military encounters, whose chroniclers adopted the term and disseminated it across Europe. The Crusaders and other European travelers accepted and spread myths such as the 'paradise legend', the 'leap of faith' legend, and the 'hashish legend', sewn together in the writings of Marco Polo.

During the medieval period, Western scholarship on the Isma'ilis contributed to the popular view of the community as a radical sect of assassins, believed to be trained for the precise murder of their adversaries. By the 14th century, European scholarship on the topic had not advanced much beyond the work and tales from the Crusaders. The origins of the word forgotten, across Europe the term assassin had taken the meaning of "professional murderer". In 1603, the first Western publication on the topic of the Assassins was authored by a court official for King Henry IV of France and was mainly based on the narratives of Marco Polo from his visits to the Near East. While he assembled the accounts of many Western travellers, the author failed to explain the etymology of the term Assassin.

According to the Lebanese writer Amin Maalouf, based on texts from Alamut, Hassan-i Sabbah tended to call his disciples Asāsīyūn (أساسيون, meaning "people who are faithful to the foundation [of the faith]"), and derivation from the term hashish is a misunderstanding by foreign travelers.

Another modern author, Edward Burman, states that:

Many scholars have argued, and demonstrated convincingly, that the attribution of the epithet "hashish-eaters" or "hashish-takers" is a misnomer derived from enemies of the Isma'ilis and was never used by Muslim chroniclers or sources. It was therefore used in a pejorative sense of "enemies" or "disreputable people". This sense of the term survived into modern times with the common Egyptian usage of the term Hashasheen in the 1930s to mean simply "noisy or riotous". It is unlikely that the austere Hassan-i Sabbah indulged personally in drug-taking ... there is no mention of that drug hashish in connection with the Persian Assassins – especially in the library of Alamut ("the secret archives").

== Military tactics ==
They call him Shaykh-al-Hashishin. He is their Elder, and upon his command all of the men of the mountain come out or go in ... they are believers of the word of their elder and everyone everywhere fears them, because they even kill kings.

— Benjamin of Tudela

In pursuit of their religious and political goals, the Isma'ilis adopted various military strategies popular in the Middle Ages. One such method was that of assassination, the selective elimination of prominent rival figures. The murders of political adversaries were usually carried out in public spaces, creating resounding intimidation for other possible enemies. Throughout history, many groups have resorted to assassination as a means of achieving political ends. The assassinations were committed against those whose elimination would most greatly reduce aggression against the Ismailis and, in particular, against those who had perpetrated massacres against the community. A single assassination was usually employed in contrast to the widespread bloodshed which generally resulted from factional combat.

While the Seljuks and Crusaders both employed murder as a military means of disposing high-profile enemies, during the Alamut period almost any murder of political significance in the Islamic lands was attributed to the Isma'ilis. So inflated had this association grown that the group became nearly synonymous with such methods of warfare, even to others who were just as radical and heretical. It was generally believed by historians, including Bernard Lewis, that Isma'ilis did not utilize poison due to the sacred nature of their missions. While such rule must have applied during their earliest operations, historian James Waterson believed that the Assassins began using poison-coated daggers as they devolved into hit men during the Mamluke dynasty. Additionally, another historian, Peter Harrison, theorized that the long curved Jambiya dagger was the preferred main killing tool of the fida'is. Codes of conduct were followed, and the Assassins were taught in the art of war, linguistics and strategies, to the point that they became nearly specialized in assassination for two centuries.

=== Fortresses ===
The military approach of the Assassins Isma'ili state was largely a defensive one, with strategically chosen sites that appeared to avoid confrontation wherever possible without the loss of life. The defining characteristic of the Assassins Isma'ili state was that it was scattered geographically throughout Persia and Syria. Alamut Castle therefore was only one of a nexus of strongholds throughout the regions where Isma'ilis could retreat to safety if necessary. West of Alamut in the Shahrud Valley, the major fortress of Lambsar served as just one example of such a retreat. In the context of their political uprising, the various spaces of Isma'ili military presence took on the name dar al-hijra (دار الهجرة; land of migration, place of refuge).

The notion of the dar al-hijra originates from the time of Muhammad, who migrated with his followers from persecution to a safe haven in Yathrib (Medina). In this way, the Fatimids found their dar al-hijra in North Africa. From 1101 to 1118, attacks and sieges were made on the fortresses, conducted by combined forces of the Seljuks Berkyaruq and Ahmad Sanjar. Although with the cost of lives and the capture and execution of Assassin da'i Ahmad ibn Attash, the Assassins managed to hold their ground and repel the attacks until the Mongol invasion. Likewise, during the revolt against the Seljuks, several fortresses served as spaces of refuge for the Isma'ilis.

During the mid-12th century the Assassins captured or acquired several fortresses in the Nusayriyah Mountain Range in coastal Syria, including Masyaf, Rusafa, al-Kahf, al-Qadmus, Khawabi, Sarmin, Quliya, Ulayqa, Maniqa, and Abu Qubays. For the most part, the Assassins maintained full control over these fortresses until 1270–1273 when the Mamluk sultan Baibars annexed them. Most were dismantled afterwards, while those at Masyaf and Ulayqa were later rebuilt. From then on, the Ismailis maintained limited autonomy over those former strongholds as loyal subjects of the Mamluks.

== Legends and folklore ==
The legends of the Assassins had much to do with the training and instruction of Assassins fida'is, famed for their public missions during which they often gave their lives to eliminate adversaries. Some historians have contributed to the tales of fida'is being fed with hashish as part of their training, but these are only in reference to the travels of Marco Polo and polemics by enemies. Scholars including Vladimir Ivanov purport that the assassinations of key figures including Seljuk vizier al-Mulk likely provided encouraging impetus to others in the community who sought to secure the Assassins' protection from political aggression. Originally a "local and popular term" first applied to the Isma'ilis of Syria, the label was orally transmitted to Western historians and thus found itself in their histories of the Assassins.

It is unknown how Hassan-i-Sabbah was able to get the Assassins to perform with such fervent loyalty. One theory, possibly the best known but also the most criticized, comes from the reports of Marco Polo during his travels to the Orient. He recounts a story he heard that Muhammad III of Alamut would drug his young followers with hashish, lead them to a "paradise", and then claim that only he had the means to allow for their return. Perceiving that Muhammad III was either a prophet or magician, his disciples, believing that only he could return them to "paradise", were fully committed to his cause and willing to carry out his every request.

The tales of the fida'is' training collected from anti-Ismaili historians and orientalist writers were compounded and compiled in Marco Polo's account, in which he described a "secret garden of paradise". After being drugged, the Ismaili devotees were said to be taken to a paradise-like garden filled with attractive young maidens and beautiful plants in which these fida'is would awaken. Here, they were told by an "old" man that they were witnessing their place in Paradise and that should they wish to return to this garden permanently, they must serve the Assassins cause. So went the tale of the "Old Man in the Mountain", assembled by Marco Polo and accepted by Joseph von Hammer-Purgstall, an 18th-century Austrian orientalist writer responsible for much of the spread of this legend. Until the 1930s, von Hammer's retelling of the Assassin legends served as the standard account of the Assassins across Europe.

A well-known legend tells how Count Henry II of Champagne, returning from Armenia, spoke with Grand Master Rashid ad-Din Sinan at al-Kahf. The count claimed to have the most powerful army and at any moment he claimed he could defeat the Hashashin, because his army was 10 times larger. Rashid replied that his army was instead the most powerful, and to prove it he told one of his men to jump off from the top of the castle in which they were staying. The man did. Surprised, the count immediately recognized that Rashid's army was indeed the strongest, because it did everything at his command, and Rashid further gained the count's respect.

The Ismaili began establishing themselves in the Indian subcontinent in the 19th century, where they largely reside today. This shift began under the leadership of the 46th Imam, Hasan Ali Shah, who was the first to be styled as Aga Khan. Modern works on the Assassins have elucidated their history and, in doing so, dispelled popular histories from the past as mere legends. In 1933, under the direction of the Imam Sultan Muhammad Shah, Aga Khan III, the Islamic Research Association was developed. Historian Vladimir Ivanov was central to both this institution and the 1946 Ismaili Society of Bombay. Cataloguing a number of Ismaili texts, Ivanov provided the ground for great strides in modern Isma'ili scholarship.

In recent years, Peter Willey has provided interesting evidence that goes against the Assassin folklore of earlier scholars. Drawing on its established esoteric doctrine, Willey asserts that the Ismaili understanding of Paradise is a deeply symbolic one. While the Qur'anic description of Heaven includes natural imagery, Willey argues that no Assassins fida'i would seriously believe that he was witnessing Paradise simply by awakening in a beauteous garden. The Assassins' symbolic interpretation of the Qur'anic description of Paradise serves as evidence against the possibility of such an exotic garden used as motivation for the devotees to carry out their armed missions. Furthermore, Willey points out that a courtier of Hulagu Khan, Juvayni, surveyed the Alamut castle just before the Mongol invasion. In his reports about the fortress, there are elaborate descriptions of sophisticated storage facilities and the famous Alamut library. However, even this anti-Ismaili historian makes no mention of the gardens on the Alamut grounds. Having destroyed a number of texts in the library's collection which he deemed to be heretical, it would be expected that Juvayni would pay significant attention to the Assassins' gardens, particularly if they were the site of drug use and temptation. Having not once mentioned such gardens, Willey concludes that there is no sound evidence in favor of these legends.

== In popular culture ==
The Assassins were part of Medieval culture, and they were either demonized or romanticized. The Hashashin frequently appeared in the art and literature of the Middle Ages. Sometimes, they were portrayed as one of the knight's archenemies, and they were also portrayed as a quintessential villain during the crusades.

The word Assassin, in variant forms, had already passed into European usage as a term for a hired professional murderer in this general sense. The Italian chronicler Giovanni Villani, who died in 1348, tells how the lord of Lucca sent 'his assassins' (i suoi assassini) to Pisa to kill a troublesome enemy there. Even earlier, Dante, in a passing reference in the 19th canto of the Inferno, completed in 1320, speaks of 'the treacherous assassin' (lo perfido assassin); his fourteenth-century commentator Francesco da Buti, explaining a term which for some readers at the time may still have been strange and obscure, remarks: 'Assassino è colui che uccide altrui per danari' (An assassin is one who kills others for money).

The most widespread awareness of the Assassins in modern Europe, and their incorporation into the Romantic tradition, was created by the Austrian historian and Orientalist Joseph von Hammer-Purgstall in his 1818 book, Die Geschichte der Assassinen aus morgenländischen Quellen (translated into English in 1835 as The History of the Assassins). This work was the standard one on the history of the Assassins in the West until the 1930s.

The Assassins appear in many role-playing games and video games, especially in massively multiplayer online games, in addition to shows and books. The assassin character class is a common feature of many such games, usually specializing in single combat and stealth skills, often combined in order to defeat an opponent without exposing the assassin to counter-attack.

- The Exile series of action role-playing games revolves around a time-traveling Syrian Assassin who assassinates various religious historical figures and modern world leaders.

The Assassin insignia in Assassin's Creed

- The Assassin's Creed video game series portrays a heavily fictionalized Ḥashshāshīn order, which has expanded beyond its Levantine confines and is depicted as having existed throughout recorded history (along with their nemesis, the Knights Templar). Both orders are portrayed as fundamentally philosophical orders, rather than religious orders, in nature, and they are expressly said to predate the faiths that their real-life counterparts arose from, thus allowing their respective "histories" to be expanded, both before and after their factual time-frames. In addition, Assassin's Creed draws much of its content from historical facts, and incorporates the purported last words of Hassan i Sabbah as the actual creed ("Nothing is true; everything is permitted"); the sources of that quote are largely unreliable. Since its release, the series has developed into a franchise which consists of novels, comic books, video games, manga, board games, short films and a theatrically released movie.
- In the Sword of Islam DLC for Paradox Interactive's grand strategy game Crusader Kings II, the Hashashin are a holy order associated with Shi'a Islam. Once established, Shi'ite rulers may hire the Hashashin to fight against non-Shi'a realms, and can potentially vassalize them. The Monks and Mystics DLC expands their role, making the Assassins a unique secret society that Shi'a characters may join.
- In the Disney movie Prince of Persia: The Sands of Time the "Hassansins" were fierce warriors, who served the kings of Persia, until disbanded. The movie's antagonist, Nizam hires them to hunt the protagonist Dastan and steal from him the Dagger of Time.
- In the Netflix series Marco Polo, the emperor Kublai Khan is attacked by a group of assassins, the Hashshashin, who are led by the Old Man of the Mountain, according to the Taoist monk Hundred Eyes, in the King's court. The Old Man of the Mountain is then pursued by Marco Polo and Byamba. The episode Hashshashin (2014) shows how the Old Man leads Marco Polo into a hallucinogenic state.
- Louis L'Amour, in his book The Walking Drum, used the assassins and the stronghold of Alamut as the location of his main character's enslaved father. Mathurin Kerbouchard, who initially seeks his father in the 12th-century Moor-controlled Spain, then throughout Europe, must ultimately travel to the Stronghold of Alamut in order to rescue Jean Kerbouchard.
- Many of Terry Pratchett's Discworld series of fantasy novels are set in the fictional city of Ankh-Morpork, where crime has become officially regulated by being organised into a number of guilds, including a Guild of Assassins. In most of the novels, the city is led by the autocrat Patrician Lord Vetinari, who began his career as a member of the Assassins Guild.
- The Faceless men, a guild of assassins in the book series A Song of Ice and Fire by George R. R. Martin and in the TV series Game of Thrones are inspired by the Order of Assassins.
- There are various Assassin class Servants who go by the name of "Hassan-i Sabbah" in the Fate/stay night anime-and-visual novel-franchise. It is established that "Hassan-i-Sabbah" is a title used by each of the nineteen leaders of the Hashshashin. The founder of the Order, identified as the "First Hassan", appears in Fate/Grand Order with the title of "Grand Assassin" due to being the origin of the word itself.
- In Batman comics and related media, the League of Assassins is a fictional offshoot of the Order of Assassins that has survived clandestinely into modern times under the immortal DC Comics supervillain Ra's al Ghul.
- In the Turkish television series Uyanış: Büyük Selçuklu, the Order of Assassins and Hassan-i Sabbah are shown as villains who are the enemies of the Seljuk Empire and Malik-Shah I.
- The book Angels & Demons by Dan Brown has a modern-day descendant of the Hassassin as a major character.
- In Umberto Eco's Baudolino, a group of adventurers at the centre of the story are enslaved by the Old Man of the Mountain, being drugged, shown paradise, and serving the order for years before escaping.
- In the Egyptian television series Ḥashāshīn (in English: The Assassins).

== See also ==
- List of assassinations by the Order of the Assassins
- List of the Order of Assassins

== Sources ==
- Thatcher, Griffithes Wheeler (1911). Assassins. Encyclopædia Britannica, 11th Edition, Volume 2, pp. 774–775.
- Boyle, John Andrew, Editor (1958), History of the World Conqueror by Ala Ad Din Ata Malik Juvaini, Harvard University Press.
- Burman, Edward (1987). The Assassins. Wellingborough: Crucible. ISBN 1-85274-027-2.
- Daftary, Farhad (2007). The Ismāʿı̄lı̄s: Their History and Doctrines (Second ed.). Cambridge: Cambridge University Press. ISBN 978-0-521-61636-2.
- Daftary, Farhad (1998). A Short History of the Ismailis: Traditions of a Muslim Community. Edinburgh: Edinburgh University Press. ISBN 978-1-84511-717-7.
- Daftary, Farhad (2012). Isma'ili History. Encyclopedia Iranica, Vol. XIV, Fasc. 2, pp. 178–195.
- Gibb, N. A. R., Editor (1932) The Damascus Chronicle of the Crusades. Extracted and translated from the Chronicle of ibn al-Qalānisi, Luzac & Company, London.
- Hodgson, Marshall G. S. (2005). The Secret Order of Assassins: The Struggle of the Early Assassins Ismâʻîlîs Against the Islamic World. Philadelphia: University of Pennsylvania Press. ISBN 978-0-8122-1916-6.
- Ivanov, Vladimir (1960). Alamut and Lamasar: two mediaeval Ismaili strongholds in Iran, an archaeological study. Tehran, Iran: Ismaili Society. p. 21.
- Lewis, Bernard (1969) [1955]. "The Ismailites and the Assassins" (PDF). In Setton, Kenneth M.; Baldwin, Marshall W. (eds.). A History of the Crusades, Volume I: The First Hundred Years. Vol. 1 (Second ed.). Madison, Milwaukee, and London: University of Wisconsin Press. pp. 99–133. ISBN 0-299-04834-9. Archived (PDF) from the original on 31 March 2016.
- Lewis, Bernard (2003). The Assassins: A Radical Sect in Islam. Phoenix. ISBN 978-1-84212-451-2. (1987 edition available online with registration)
- Lockhart, Laurence (1930). Hasan-i-Sabbah and the Assassins. London: University of London.
- Maalouf, Amin (1998). Samarkand. New York: Interlink Publishing Group.
- Nowell, Charles E. (1947). "The Old Man of the Mountain". Speculum. 22 (4): 497–519. doi:10.2307/2853134. JSTOR 2853134. S2CID 162344752.
- Raphael, Kate (2011). Muslim Fortresses in the Levant: Between Crusaders and Mongols. Taylor & Francis US. ISBN 978-0-415-56925-5.
- Richards, D. S., Editor (2010). The Chronicle of Ibn al-Athir for the Crusading Period from al-Kamil fi'l-Ta'rikh. Part 1, 1097–1146., Ashgate Publishing, Farnham, UK.
- Richards, D. S., Editor (2007), The Chronicle of Ibn al-Athir for the Crusading Period from al-Kamil fi'l-Ta'rikh. Part 2, 1146–1193, Ashgate Publishing, Farnham, UK.
- Runciman, Steven (1952). A History of the Crusades, Volume II: The Kingdom of Jerusalem and the Frankish East. Vol. 2. Cambridge: Cambridge University Press.
- Runciman, Steven (1954). A History of the Crusades, Volume III: The Kingdom of Acre and the Later Crusades. Vol. 3. Cambridge: Cambridge University Press.
- Wasserman, James (2001). The Templars and the Assassins. Rochester, Vermont: Inner Traditions International. ISBN 978-1-59477-873-5.
- Willey, Peter (2005). Eagle's Nest: Ismaili Castles in Iran and Syria. New York: I.B. Tauris Publishers. ISBN 1-85043-464-6.
