= Al-Qadi al-Nu'man =

10th-century Muslim historian

al-Qadi Ali ibn al-Nu'man
- علي بن النعمان بن محمد بن منصور بن أحمد بن حيون التميمي
- Born: 896/897; Kairouan, Abbasid Caliphate (now Tunisia)
- Died: 974; Cairo, Fatimid Caliphate (now Egypt)
- Occupations: Historian, Jurist, Islamic scholar

Academic work
- Era: Islamic Golden Age
- Main interests: Islamic jurisprudence, History, Esoteric interpretation of the Quran
- Notable works: Kitab Da'a'im al-Islam (The Pillars of Islam)
- Notable ideas: Founder of Fatimid Ismaili jurisprudence

Abū Ḥanīfa Ali ibn al-Nuʿmān ibn Muḥammad ibn Manṣūr ibn Aḥmad ibn Ḥayyūn al-Tamīmiyy (Arabic: علي بن النعمان بن محمد بن منصور بن أحمد بن حيون التميمي), generally known as al-Qāḍī al-Nu‘mān (القاضي النعمان) or as ibn Ḥayyūn (ابن حيون) (died 974 CE/363 AH) was an Isma'ili jurist, hadith scholar and the official historian of the Fatimid Caliphate. He was also called Qāḍī al-Quḍāt (قَاضِي القضاة) "Jurist of the Jurists" and Dāʻī al-Duʻāt (داعي الدعاة) "Missionary of Missionaries".

== Biography ==
Born in Kairouan, in what is now Tunisia, al-Nu'man converted to Isma'ilism and began his career in Ifriqiya (now Tunisia, western Libya and eastern Algeria) under the first Fatimid caliph, Abdullah al-Mahdi Billah (r. 909-934 CE/297-322 AH), quickly rising to become the most prominent judge (qadi) of the Fatimid state.

His father, Muhammad ibn Mansur (d. 351 H/923 CE), had trained as a Sunni Maliki jurist in Qayrawan. Some have suggested that al-Qadi al-Numan's father converted to Isma'ili Shi'ism prior to the founding of the Fatimid Caliphate, suggesting that al-Qadi al-Nu'man was raised an Isma'ili. Ibn Taghribirdi has alternatively suggested however that al-Qadi al-Nu'man was a Hanafi prior to his own conversion to Isma'ili Shi'ism. This has largely been dismissed due to the assumption that Ibn Taghribirdi based this on the apparently erroneous idea that the Hanafi school had been pre-dominant in North Africa until al-Mu'izz ibn Badis imposed the Maliki school. However, Ibn Taghribirdi's assertion may have alternatively been based on the fact that al-Qadi al-Numan's patronymic, "Abu Hanifah," matches with the name of the eponymous founder of the Hanafi school. This may lend support to the idea that his father, Muhammad, may have converted to the Hanafi school prior to any conversion to Isma'ili Shi'ism. Regardless, al-Qadi al-Numani certainly was an Isma'ili when he entered the employ of the Fatimids at a young age.

During his lifetime, al-Qadi al-Nu'man served four Fatimid Caliphs:

- Abdullah al-Mahdi Billah
- al-Qa'im
- al-Mansur Billah
- al-Mu'izz li-Din Allah

During al-Nu'man's fifty years of service to the Fatimids, he wrote a vast number of books under the encouragement of the caliphs on history, biography, fiqh (Islamic jurisprudence) and the esoteric interpretation of the Quran. After the Fatimid conquest of Egypt and Syria, al-Nu'man left Ifriqiya and travelled to the newly founded city of Cairo, where he eventually died in 974 CE/363 AH.

Under al-Mahdi began the career of Qadi al-Numan (d. 974), the founder of Ismaili law and author of its most authoritative compendium, the Kitab da'a'im al-Islam (Book of the pillars of Islam). In the absence of an Ismaili legal tradition, Qadi al-Numan relied primarily on the legal teaching of Imams Muhammad al-Baqir and Ja'far al-Sadiq, transmitted by Twelver Shii traditionists, and secondarily on Zaydi traditions.

It gives the imam authority for determining the beginning of the month without regard to the sighting of the new moon as required by all other Muslim legal schools. Since the early Fatimid period the beginning of the months was generally established in practice on the basis of astronomical calculation and thus often fell one or two days earlier than for other Muslims; this discrepancy often caused intercommunal quarrels about the beginning and end of the fasting month of Ramadan.

== His works ==
Al-Nu'man's work consists of over 40 treatises on fiqh, history, religious beliefs and Quranic esoteric exegesis. Fuat Sezgin cites 22 works by him.

Al-Nu'man's most prominent work, the Da'a'im al-Islam (Arabic: دعائم الاسلام "The Pillars of Islam"), which took nearly thirty years to complete, is an exposition of Isma'ili jurisprudence. This work was finally completed during the reign of the fourth caliph, al-Mu'izz li-Din Allah (r. 953-975 CE/ 341-365 AH), was accepted in its time as the official code of the Fatimid Caliphate, and serves to this day as the primary source of religious law (sharia) for some Musta'li communities, particularly Tayyibi Isma'ilis. Iran incorporated the Da'a'im al-Islam into their constitution. The book consists of 32 chapters in two volumes. The first volume consists of 7 chapters discussing the Seven pillars of Ismailism. The second volume consists of 25 chapters about various topics relating to different facets of life.

Alongside his Pillars of Islam, the Foundation of Symbolic Interpretation (Asās al-Taʾwīl), is one of al-Nu’man's most celebrated works and deals with esoteric interpretation (taʾwīl). In the author's own words, “Our aim [with the Asās al-Taʾwīl] is to explain the inner dimension (bāṭin) of what we laid out in the book Daʿāʾim al-Islām, so that this book may be a source for the inner meaning (bāṭin), just as that one is for the external form (ẓāhir).

Qadi al-Nu'man believed that it is important to recognize and understand the symbolism behind the stories in the Quran based on certain verses that point to an inner meaning such as: “Thus your Lord will choose you and teach you the symbolic interpretation (taʾwīl) of events (aḥadīth)” (Quran 12:21). In his work Foundation of Symbolic Interpretation (Asās al-Taʾwīl), he indicates that God made the Quran the miracle of Muhammad and its inner meaning the miracle of the Imams. Just as nobody can replicate the miracle of the Book, nobody can produce its inner meanings except for the Imams. This sacred knowledge is passed down through generations in their lineage and is entrusted to them.

Another major work, the Kitab iftitah al-da‘wa wa-ibtida’ al-dawla ("The Beginning of the Mission and Establishment of the State") narrates the rise of the Fatimids. It mentions the initial stages of the Isma'ili dawah in Yemen under Ibn Hawshab. It also discusses Abu Abdallah al-Shi'i's correspondence with the Kutama Imazighen and their military expeditions, leading to the conquest of the Aghlabids, who ruled Ifriqiya. It discusses Imam al-Mahdi's emigration from Salamiyah, his captivity in Sijilmasa and eventual release, culminating in the establishment of the Fatimid state in 909. The book also gives an account of the circumstances leading to the revolt of al-Shi'i, for which it holds responsible the incitement of his elder brother Abu al-Abbas, and his later execution. It also gives a description of the Fatimid state up to the year 957, when the book was completed.

Ikhtilaf usul al-madhahib ("Differences Among the Schools of Law") was a refutation of Sunni principles of Islamic jurisprudence written at roughly the same time as the earliest of such works. Nu'man's book borrows heavily from those of Dawud al-Zahiri, Muhammad bin Dawud al-Zahiri and al-Tabari, three Sunni authors about whom Nu'man displays complex mixed feelings. It has been noted that while Nu'man's book is famous, it was not the first Ismali refutation of Sunni juristic principles.

Al-Nu'man's other major works are the Kitab al-majalis wa’l-musayarat ("The Book of Sessions and Excursions"), in which he has entailed in detail words of Imams in majlis, or just while walking which he had taken note of, and the wisdom encased within them) and the Kitab al-himma fi adab atba‘ al-a’imma ("The Book of Etiquette Necessary for Followers of the Imams").

== Sources ==
- Al-Nu'man (2018). "Al-Nu'man, Al-Qadi (d. 363 AH/ 974 CE) | The Institute of Ismaili Studies". iis.ac.uk. Archived from the original on 2018-01-04.
- Daftary, Farhad (1990). The Ismāʿı̄lı̄s: Their History and Doctrines (First ed.). Cambridge: Cambridge University Press. ISBN 978-0-521-37019-6.
- Daftary, Farhad (2006). "Archived copy" (PDF). In Leaman, Oliver (ed.). The Biographical Encyclopaedia of Islamic Philosophy. Continuum International Publishing Group. Archived from the original (PDF) on 2013-07-23.
- Fyzee, Asaf A. A. (1974). The Book of Faith: Translated from the 'Da'a'im al-Islam' of Qadi Nu'man. Nachiketa Publication Ltd.
- Poonawala, Ismail K. (2002). The Pillars of Islam: Acts of devotion and religious observances. Oxford University Press.
- Poonawala, Ismail K. (2016). "Ismaʿilism xi. Ismaʿili Jurisprudence". Encyclopædia Iranica.
- Sezgin, Fuat (1967). Geschichte des Arabischen Schrifttums. Vol. I. Brill. pp. 575–578. ISBN 9789004020078.
- Stewart, Devin J. (2002). "Muhammad b. Dawud al-Zahiri's Manual of Jurisprudence". In Weiss, Bernard G. (ed.). Studies in Islamic Law and Society Volume 15: Studies in Islamic Legal Theory. Brill.
