= Haft Bab-i Abu Ishaq Ibrahim =

Haft Bab (Persian: ھفت باب), or “Seven Chapters,” is one of the most important literary remains of the Nizari branch of Isma’ilism from the early post-Alamut period. It was written by Abu Ishaq Ibrahim of Quhistan, an important center of Isma’ilism in Eastern Persia. For about two centuries after the Mongols destroyed the Nizari Isma’ili state of Alamut in 1256 C.E., Nizari da’wa remained inactive because the Imams were in hiding. However, from the middle of the fifteenth century C.E., the Qasimshahi Nizari imams resurfaced and established themselves in Anjudan, inspiring a rich tradition of literary activity. Haft Bab, which was written at the beginning of the sixteenth century C.E. is perhaps one of the earliest doctrinal treatises written in Persian from this Anjudan period.

== Contents ==
The author starts by recounting his search for religious truth and how he found it in what is now called Isma’ilism. He follows this with a refutation of the various sects other than the Isma’ilis. In his refutation, Quhistani particularly targets those who do not believe in prophets, and those Muslims who do not accept chain of Imamate established through the Prophet Muhammad’s son-in-law, Ali. He also refutes other branches of the Shi’i. Next, Quhistani claims that the continuous presence of an Imam in the Isma’ili community establishes that they possess the truth. Evoking a famous hadith of the Prophet Muhammad, he claims that the Isma’ilis are that very branch amongst the seventy-three sects that the hadith narrates will be saved. Later, Quhistani discusses several topics about the concept and practice of Imamate. In a move that attempts to safeguard the infallible authority of a potentially fallible human Imam, Quhistani argues that the believers should focus more on the doctrines the Imam expounds rather than his actions, which are more likely to be fallible. He also enumerates the Imams till his time. Quhistani follows this with a chapter about the role of the prophet and his successor (wasi); he focuses particularly on the revealed law and its allegorical interpretation.

== Haft Bāb-ī Bābā Sayyidnā ==
In the two chapters that follow (v-vi), Quhistani follows closely an earlier book by an unnamed author in the days of the Lords of Alamut. This earlier book was subsequently attributed to Hasan al-Sabbah (called Bābā Sayyidnā, “our lord” by Isma’ilis) and, therefore, is popularly known as Haft Bāb-ī Bābā Sayyidnā, “The Seven Chapter of Our Lord.” Not only does Quhistani follow the arguments of this earlier work, at times, he also seems to follow it stylistically. The author of Haft Bāb-ī Bābā Sayyidnā argues that other sects of Islam cannot possibly escape either the pitfall of anthropomorphism or that of ta’til (denying God’s attributes). The only solution according to Haft Bāb-ī Bābā Sayyidnā, which Quhistani follows very closely, lies in the (Nizari) Isma’ili doctrine that the god-head reveals itself in the Imam. Right after qualifying this claim, Quhistani then describes the scene of the qiyāma, or “final resurrection,” which marked the proclamation of the new Nizari theology in 1164 C.E. Now, departing from the style and arguments of Haft Bāb-ī Bābā Sayyidnā, Quhistani reimagines the eschatology of his source and details the progress of the believers in the various grades of the da’wa. Finally, in the last chapter, Quhistani deals with the ta’wil, or “allegorical interpretations,” of Islamic ritual practices and a number of Qur’anic verses.

== About the author ==
Most of the little that is known about Abu Ishaq Quhistani is from his sole surviving work, Haft Bab, and a few Persian historians that came later. From what these sources suggest, Quhistani was a prominent Nizari Ismaili author and da’i (missionary) who lived in the second half of the fifteenth century C.E. and died a bit after 1498 C.E. He was born in Quhistan –– the medieval name for Khurasan –– to the east of Birjand, in the district of Mu’minabad. It is likely that he spent most of his life in that part of Persia. Quhistani was born into a non-Isma’ili family and converted to Isma’ilism in his youth due to the influence of a local da’i. Eventually, he rose to a post in the da’wa, or “missionary organization,” of the Quhistani Nizaris. Quhistani was also a contemporary of the thirty-fourth Qasimshahi Nizari imam, Al-Mustansir Billah III (d. 1498), whose mausoleum is still intact in the village of Anjudan in central Persia
