= Qiyama (disambiguation) =

Qiyama or Qiyamah is an Arabic term that means "resurrection". It may also refer to:

- Al-Qiyama, the 75th sura (chapter) of the Qur'an
- Qiyamah, the Islamic concept of Judgment Day
  - Qiyāma (Nizārī Ismāʿīlī doctrine), eschatological teaching in Nizārī Ismāʿīlīsm.

== See also ==
- Qayamat (disambiguation)
