= Da'a'im al-Islam =

Book of Ismaili jurisprudence by al-Qadi al-Nu'man

Da'a'im al-Islam (Arabic: دعائم الإسلام lit. The Pillars of Islam) is a primary book of Ismaili Shia Islamic jurisprudence.

The book was written by Al-Qadi al-Nu'man. He served as da'i of four imams (from Ismaili 11th Imam Abdullah al-Mahdi Billah to 14th Imam al-Mu'izz li-Din Allah the first four Fatimid caliphs of Egypt). The book emphasizes what importance Islam has given to manners and etiquette along with Ibadah, the worship of God, citing references of first five Fatimid imams and earlier Shia Imams, Hasan, Husayn, al-Sajjad Zaynulabedin, Muhammad al-Baqir and Jafar-as-Sadiq.

Subsequent Fatimid Imams or caliphs, and Ismaili dai's have relied on Da'a'im-ul-Islam'. The 16th Fatimid Imam — Caliph Al-Hakim bi-Amr Allah (996–1021) — ordered his dai's, among them Harun bin Mohammed in Yemen, to give decisions exclusively in light of Da'a'im al-Islam.

== Sources ==
- Daftary, Farhad (1990). The Isma'ilis: Their History and Doctrines. Cambridge University Press.
- Stewart, Devin (2015). Al-Qadi al-Numan: Disagreements of the Jurist. New York and London: New York University Press. ISBN 9780814763926.
