= Qiyama (Nizari Isma'ilism) =

Eschatological teaching in Nizārī Ismāʿīlīsm

In Nizārī Ismāʿīlism, the qiyāma (Arabic: قيامة, "resurrection") was ceremoniously proclaimed at the mountain fortress of Alamūt in 1164 CE by the Nizārī imām Ḥasan ʿAlā Dhikrihi al-Salām (Ḥasan II). According to standard narratives of Islamic eschatology, the Yawm al-Qiyāmah ("the Day of Resurrection") is to take place at the end of time, at which point people will be called to account for their actions, and then be rewarded or punished accordingly. The Nizārī proclamation of qiyāma, however, is distinct in that it takes place within history, and, as such, assumes a special significance.

== Proclamation ==
On 8 August 1164, Hasan Alā Zikrihi's-Salām assembled a public gathering at the fortress of Alamut. At this ceremony, Ḥasan II announced that the community had arrived at the time of qiyāma, and that Ismaili practice would change from traditional islamic practice. Similar ceremonies were held to promulgate the abrogation at the Mu'min-Abad Castle by the muhtasham in Quhistan, and in Syria by the new da'i, Rashid ad-Din Sinan.

In October 1164, Ḥasan II once again assembled a public gathering at Alamūt and Muʾminābād to proclaim the qiyāma, however this time Ḥasan II identified himself as God's khalīfa, in effect designating himself as the imām and qāʾim ("resurrector"). As such, Ḥasan II became the first openly manifest imām in the Nizārī period.

== Significance in Nizārī Ismāʿīlism ==
Qiyama in the Nizari Ismaili tradition symbolizes spiritual transformation. According to the Ismaili interpretation of sharīʿa (Islamic law) as possessing a distinct duality, the rational shari'a refers to civil legal mechanisms, including property laws, marriage laws, and laws against murder or theft; the imposed shari'a, meanwhile, concerns matters of religious law and ritual practice, including fasting, pilgrimage, and ablution. Upon the proclamation of qiyama, the rational shari'a remained in place as a central element of upholding lawful societal order. Then imposed shari'a, however, was transformed to reflect a more spiritual form of ibadat, further reflecting the Ismaili tradition's emphasis of the esoteric significance of shari'a, or the knowledge that the acts outlined within the imposed shari'a symbolize. In this regard, the imposed shari'a itself was not abrogated, but many of its elements were formally altered. Under qiyama, the ritual shari'a now reflected more esoteric interpretations and practices of the five pillars of Islam. Specific times of worship (including the five daily prayers), for example, were abolished in favor of a more esoteric form of salat, in which a believer was to assume a perpetual state of prayer by remembering God and obeying the Imam. Rather than physical fasting during Ramadan, the "true" fast was interpreted in an esoteric sense as the surrender of one's faculties to the command of God for the entire year. Similarly, the requirement of the ritual practice of Hajj was supplanted by the practice of an esoteric Hajj, in which a believer sought to abandon the perishable world for the sake of the eternal world. In this regard, qiyama signified the elevation of ritual worship to a more spiritual level, emphasizing the practice of the bāṭin, the esoteric dimension of the Ismaili tradition.

The significance of qiyama also lies within its connection to the notion of the cycles of Prophecy and Imamah within the Ismaili tradition. Verse 7:54 of the Holy Qur'an makes mention of the "Six Days" of Creation, which, according to the taʾwīl (esoteric meaning) of the verse, refer to Six Cycles of Revelation, which are individually inaugurated by a major Prophet-Enunciator, or natiq. Each natiq composes the exoteric expression (tanzil) of divine guidance, and shari'a in their exoteric meaning. In the Ismaili tradition, the Imam, teaches the ta'wil of divine guidance and shari'a to reveal its esoteric meaning. The proclamation of qiyama by Imam Hasan 'Ala Zikhrihi's-Salam reflected this seventh Cycle, in which the Imam, representing the Qa'im or resurrector, formally instituted the period of resurrection.

In addition to its ritual significance, the proclamation of qiyama by Imam Hasan 'Ala Zikhrihi's-Salam reflected the conclusion of the first period of dawr-al-satr (period of concealment) in which the Ismaili Imams were physically concealed from followers. In this regard, qiyama reflected a transitory condition of life that removed the veil of taqiyya (concealment) and facilitated greater accessibility to the ḥaqīqa (truth), thereby allowing followers of the Imam to understand their claim to Paradise as "people of gradation", or the elite of mankind. Consequently, qiyama transformed the definition of this concealment within the Ismaili tradition from the physical hiddenness of the Imam to instead reflect the concealment of spiritual truths.

According to Farhad Daftary:

Relying heavily on Ismaili taʾwīl or esoteric exegesis, and drawing on earlier Ismaili teachings and traditions, however, the qiyāma was interpreted symbolically and spiritually for the living Nizārīs. It, in fact, meant nothing more than the manifestation of unveiled truth (ḥaqīqa) in the person of the Nizārī Ismaili imam. And as such, it was a spiritual resurrection reserved exclusively for Nizārīs wherever they existed. In other words, those who acknowledged the Nizārī imam were now capable of understanding the truth, or the esoteric essence of religion, and, therefore, Paradise was actualised for them in this very corporeal world.

The "symbolic" and "spiritual" interpretation of qiyāma relates to the dialectic of the ẓāhir ("outward" or "exoteric") and the bāṭin ("inward" or "esoteric"), concepts that are fundamental to Ismāʿīlī doctrinal thought. In terms of religious belief and practice, this meant that the sharīʿa ("religious law"), and the associated practices of taqiyya ("religious dissimulation"), had been abrograted to accommodate the ḥaqīqa ("divine truth"). As Marshall Hodgson explains:

The end of the rule of taqiyya followed naturally from the coming of the Qâʾim, whose manifest and universal power would make taqiyya unnecessary for the protection of the faithful. But its meaning here was no longer simply the guarding of the inner religious truth of the mission of ʿAlî from prying Sunnî eyes. All those outer forms which the Shîʿa shared more or less with the Sunnîs had come to be lumped together in popular Ismâʿîlî consciousness as being enforced by taqiyya. In the Qiyâma now the learned Ismâʿîlî tradition, in the person of Ḥasan II, was indirectly admitting the validity of their notion. The lifting of taqiyya was made to involve the rejection of all the outer ritual law. The imâm was now of his mercy granting permission to live without cult, in the spirit alone, which he had formerly forbidden. The end of the sharîʿa could conceivably have been presented as itself a natural consequence of the Resurrection—and no doubt it was so taken in part: there will be no laws in Paradise.

The Nizari qiyama is also compared to the theology of Paul the Apostle.
