= Those firmly rooted in knowledge =

Term in the Qur'an

- Arabic: الراسخون في العلم
- Romanization: al-rasikhuna fi 'l-'ilm
- Literal meaning: Those firmly rooted in knowledge

Those firmly rooted in knowledge (Arabic: الراسخون في العلم) is a recurring theme in the Qur'an and Sunnah. This term is of special interest for the Shi'a.

The term and its like is used in Al-Imran ^{[Quran 3:7]} and ^{[Quran 4:162]}.

== A crux in 3:7 ==
This verse is a crux interpretum, in that it can be read in two ways, with a pause and without. The phrase is either the end of the sentence that precedes it, or the beginning of a new sentence. Sunni and Shi'a differ in their readings.

=== Sunni view ===
All those who speak truth, their hearts are firm in belief, do not commit any unlawful acts, those who are well grounded in their knowledge of Deen, their knowledge translates into their actions, does not swear or take false oaths, does not consume wealth unlawfully.

Sunni view that those firmly rooted in knowledge are the body of Muslim Jurists (Arabic: Ulema) who interpret the Divine Law (Arabic: sharia), deriving the Islamic Jurisprudence (Arabic: Fiqh).

Ulema is the plural of Alim, Arabic for knowledgeable. This connects to the Arabic for knowledge, ilm, the last word of this term: "al-rasikhuna fi 'l-'ilm"

=== Shi'a view ===
Shi'a view those firmly rooted in knowledge to be Muhammad's household and (Arabic: Ahl al-Bayt) himself. See Al-Imran ^{[Quran 3:7]} for some hadith in this regard.

== See also ==
- Muhkam and Mutashabih
