= Qayamat =

Qayamat may refer to:

- Islamic eschatology ("Qayāmat")
- Qayamat (1983 film), an Indian film
- Qayamat – A Love Triangle In Afghanistan, a 2003 Pakistani film
- Qayamat: City Under Threat, a 2003 Indian film
- Qayamat (TV series), a 2021 Pakistani television series
- Kayamath, Indian TV series
- Qayamat Ki Raat, Indian supernatural television drama
- Qayamat Se Qayamat Tak, 1988 Indian Hindi-language romance film
- Keyamat Theke Keyamat, Bangladeshi movie

== See also ==
- Qiyama (disambiguation)
- Kantri, a 2008 Indian Telugu-language film, Hindi title Ek Aur Qayamat (lit. 'One More Qayamat')
