= Muhkam and Mutashabih =

Terminology used in the Quran

Muḥkam and Mutashābih (Arabic: محکم ومتشابه) in Quranic exegesis is the categorization of verses as "clear" (muḥkam) or "ambiguous" (mutashābih).

The definition of the two terms was and remains contentious. Some exegetes consider the distinction to be of whether or not the verses require further interpretation or reflection when read. Others consider muḥkam to be verses with one meaning and mutashābih those with multiple possible meanings (and for which the most appropriate meaning needs to be deduced.)

Some of the most important mutashābih verses are those that describe God in anthropomorphic terms, including him having "Hands", a "Face" or ascending/being on "the Throne". The question of if these terms should be read literally or metaphorically was debated extensively in the early centuries of Islam, and continues to be debated.

== Quranic passage ==
The basis of the division of verses is the Quranic passage:

He it is Who has revealed the Book to you; some of its verses are decisive (Muhkam), they are the basis of the Book, and others are allegorical (Mutashabih); then as for those in whose hearts there is perversity they follow the part of it which is allegorical, seeking to mislead and seeking to give it (their own) interpretation. but none knows its interpretation except Allah, and those who are firmly rooted in knowledge say: We believe in it, it is all from our Lord; and none do mind except those having understanding.

== Commentary ==
Tafsir al-Tustari carries a report attributed toʿAlī in which he states:

[Those rooted in knowledge] are the ones whom knowledge has protected from plunging [into the interpretation of the Qurʾān] according to some whim (hawā) or with set arguments (ḥujaj maḍrūba) without [awareness of] the unseen [mysteries] (ghuyūb).

== See also ==
- Those firmly rooted in knowledge
