= Hassan III of Alamut =

25th Ismaili Nizari Imam Jalāl al-Dīn Ḥassan from 1210 to 1221

Jalāl al-Dīn Ḥasan III: جلال الدین حسن
- 25th Ismaili Nizari Imam Jalāl al-Dīn Ḥasan

25th Imām of the Nizari Isma'ilis
- Tenure: 1210 – 1221
- Predecessor: Nūr al-Dīn Muḥammad
- Successor: ʿAlāʾ ad-Dīn Muḥammad III
- Born: 583 AH/1187 AD
- Died: 618 AH/1221 AD

Jalāl al-Dīn Ḥasan III (جلال الدین حسن) (1187–1221), son of Nūr al-Dīn Muḥammad II, was the 25th Nizari Isma'ili Imām. He ruled from 1210 to 1221.

== His life ==
He was born to the 24th Imam and a Sunni mother. Jalal al-Din Hassan claimed to have converted to Sunni Islam, which was accepted by Abbasid Caliph al-Nasir and other Muslim princes and he became known as naw musalman (Persian: نومسلمان, "Muslim convert"). He repudiated the faith and policies associated with earlier Lords of Alamut and went so far as to curse his ancestors and burn the books of Hasan ibn Sabah. He invited many Sunni scholars and jurists from across Khurasan, Qazvin and Iraq to visit Alamut Castle, and even invited them to inspect the library and remove any books they found to be objectionable. He also instructed these scholars to teach his followers, whom he commanded to observe the Sunni Sharia. However, his conversion has been interpreted by some as an act of taqiyya.

During his lifetime, he maintained friendly relations with the `Abbasid Caliph al-Nasir. An alliance with the caliph of Baghdad meant greater resources for the self-defence of not only the Nizārī Ismā'īlī state, but also the broader Muslim world. He also personally led his army to assist Uzbek, ruler of the Eldiguzids, against a rebel.

He died in 1221, possibly the result of poisoning. He was married to four Sunni women from the daughters of the princes of Gilan, after he sought the princes' permission, who then asked the Abbasid Caliph, who approved. They, along with some of Ḥassan III's kinsfolk, including his sister, were executed by his son's vizier under allegations of poisoning Ḥassan III.

His Sunni conformity was gradually reversed and his community increasingly regarded itself openly as Ismaili Shiite during the Imamate of his only surviving son and successor, ʻAlāʼ ad-Dīn Muḥammad III, who succeeded him at the age of 9 years old. However, his son upon succession was initially too young, so Ḥassan III's vizier controlled the state.

== See also ==
- Alamut
- Alamut Castle
- Lambasar Castle
- Nizārī Ismā'īlī state
- List of Ismaili Imams
- Nūru-d-Dīn Muḥammad II
- Fatimids
- Isma'ilism
- Nizari
- Aga Khan

Jalaluddin Hasan of the Ahl al-Bayt Banu Hashim Clan of the Banu Quraish Born: 1187 C.E Died: 1221 C.E.
Regnal titles
| Preceded by Nūru-d-Dīn Muḥammad II (‘A'lā Muḥammad) | 6th Ruler of Nizārī Ismā'īlī state and Commander of Alamut Castle; 1210–1221 | Succeeded by ‘Alā’ ad-Dīn Muḥammad III |
Shia Islam titles
| Preceded by Nūr al-Dīn Muḥammad II (‘A'lā Muḥammad) | Imām Jalālu-d-Dīn Ḥassan III; 25th Imām of Nizārī Ismā'īlīs; 1210–1221 | Succeeded by ‘Alā’ ad-Dīn Muḥammad III |
