= Esoteric interpretation of the Quran =

Esoteric interpretation of the Quran (Arabic: التأويل الباطني للقرآن, romanized: attaʾwīl al-bāṭinī li-l-qurʾān) is the allegorical interpretation of the Quran or the quest for its hidden, inner meanings. The Arabic word taʾwīl was synonymous with conventional interpretation in its earliest use, but it came to mean a process of discerning its most fundamental understandings. Esoteric interpretations do not usually contradict the conventional (in this context called exoteric) interpretations; instead, they discuss the inner levels of meaning of the Quran.

The Arabic words taʾwīl and tafsīr both mean roughly "explanation, elucidation, interpretation, and commentary"; but from the end of the 8th century CE onwards, taʾwīl was commonly regarded as the esoteric or mystical interpretation of the Quran, while the conventional exegesis of the Quran was referred to using the term tafsīr. The term batin refers to the inner or esoteric meaning of a sacred text, and zahīr to the apparent or exoteric meaning. Esoteric interpretations are found in the Shīʿa, Sufi, and Sunnī branches of Islam and their respective interpretations of the Quran. A ḥadīth report which states that the Quran has an inner meaning, and that this inner meaning conceals a yet deeper inner meaning, and so on (up to seven successive levels of deeper meaning), has sometimes been used in support of this view.

== Quranic esotericism ==
Traditional scholars agree that some passages of the Quran leave certain ideas implied rather than stated and that, from the outset, the Quran cautions that some verses are literal in meaning, while others, named "mutashabihat", are metaphorical in meaning:

"It is God who has sent down to you the book: In it are verses clear (muhkamat), they are the foundation of the book, others are unspecific (mutashabihat)." (Quran 3:7)

Esoteric exegesis attempts to unveil the inner meaning of the Quran by moving beyond the apparent point of the verses and relating Quranic verses to the inner and the metaphysical dimensions of consciousness and existence. The exoteric aspect is the literal word, the law, and the material text of the Quran, and the esoteric aspect is the hidden meaning. Esoteric interpretations are more suggestive than declarative and are 'allusions' rather than 'explanations' and indicate possibilities as much as they demonstrate the insights of each writer.

However the Quran says this about doing so (Sahih Int. Translation): "As for those in whose hearts is deviation [from truth], they will follow that of it which is unspecific, seeking discord and seeking an interpretation [suitable to them]. And no one knows its [true] interpretation except Allah. But those firm in knowledge say, "We believe in it. All [of it] is from our Lord." And no one will be reminded except those of understanding." (from verse 3:7)

Only a few examples are given here. In Q7:172, the Quran states:

"And when Your Lord summoned the descendants of Adam, and made them testify about themselves. "Am I not your Lord?" They said, "Yes, we testify." Thus you cannot say on the Day of Resurrection we were unaware of this."

According to the above verse, before the Creation, God called the future humanity out of the loins of the not-yet-created Adam and addressed them with the words: "Am I not your Lord?", and they answered: "Yes, we witness it". In Islam, this "primordial covenant" is the metahistorical foundation between God and humankind.

The Quran first mentions an 'inner meaning' (ta'wil) in Q18:65–82 in the story of Moses and Khidr, a mystical figure of the ancient Middle East who reluctantly accepts Moses as his traveling student. When Khidr performs strange acts, Moses questions him about them. Khidr gives him the 'inner explanation' (ta'wil) of his actions. Along the way, the esoteric being damages a boat belonging to poor people. Moses is so disturbed that he keeps protesting despite his agreement to keep silent. At the end of the journey, Khidr tells Moses the reasons for his inexplicable actions: "As for the ship, it belonged to poor people working at sea, so I intended to cause defect in it as there was after them a king who seized every ship by force."

In Q56:79, the Quran describes itself: "This is an honorable Quran, in a book hidden, which none can touch except the purified." In the exoteric sense, the Quran requires Muslims to perform ritual cleansing of their hands before touching it. Esoteric interpreters were of the opinion that the Quran implies that individuals with spiritual purity are able to grasp its meaning.

Attar of Nishapur, a 12th-century mystical poet, gives a mystical interpretation of the Quranic story of the descent of Adam and Eve from Paradise to Earth. According to Attar, "the man whose mind and vision are ensnared by heaven's grace must forfeit that same grace, for only then can he direct his face To his true Lord." Occasionally, a verse may be interpreted in a sense very different from its conventional meaning. For example, Hamadani, in his book Tamheedat ('Preludes'), interprets Q104:6–7 ("It is a fierce fire created by God, to penetrate into the hearts."), which conventionally refers to the punishment in hell, to be the passion of divine love. Hamadani interprets Q14:48 ("On the Day when the earth is changed into another earth, and the heavens, and they will emerge before God"), which conventionally describes the Day of Judgment as a description of the moment of spiritual awakening or enlightenment. Sufis believe that Quran's initial letters (Muqatta'at) conceal mysteries that can not be fully expressed in words and should be understood as mystic experiences. In Sufi commentaries of the Quran, Sufism concepts are commonly related such as the hierarchical levels of realities in human experience (human, supra-sensible, and divine levels), the various states of consciousness such as sustaining in hell (khaledeen in gahanm) and residing in paradise (khaldeed in janna), and the ideas concerning the six subtleties (lataif-e-sitta).

A hadith attributed to Muhammad is essential in understanding the inward aspects of the Quran, and it is fundamental to Quranic exegesis:

"The Quran possesses an external appearance and a hidden depth, an exoteric meaning and an esoteric meaning. This esoteric meaning in turn conceals an esoteric meaning so it goes on for seven esoteric meanings (seven depths of hidden depth)."

There is a statement made by the Imam, Jafar Sadiq (d. 765 CE):

"The book of God comprises four things: the statement set down, the allusions, the hidden meanings relating to the supra-sensible world, and the exalted spiritual doctrines. The literal statement is for the ordinary believers. The allusions are the concern of the elite. The hidden meanings pertain to the friends of God. The exalted spiritual doctrines are the province of the prophets."

== Esoteric interpretations ==
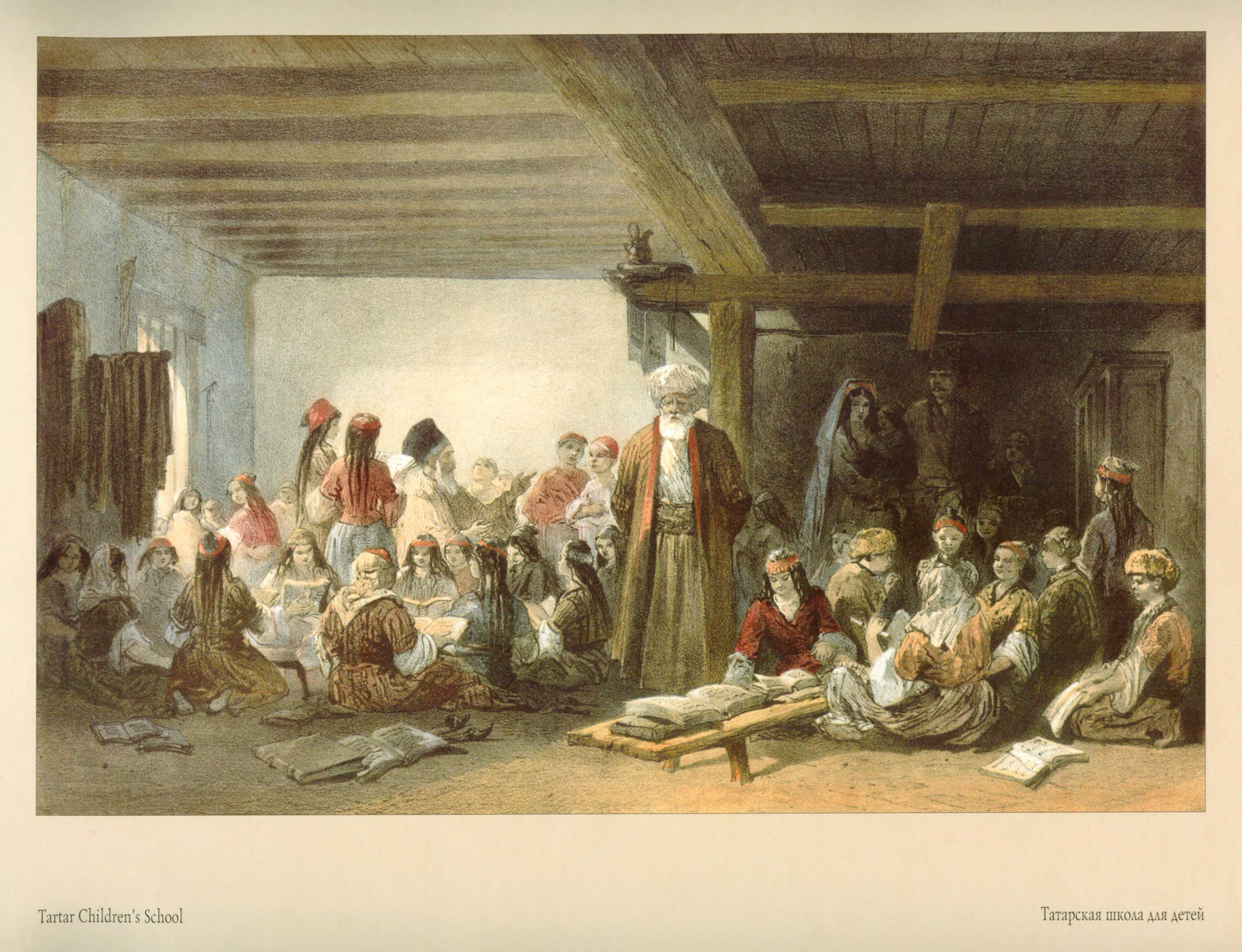
Tatar children learning Quran in Crimea. Lithograph by Carlo Bossoli, 1856

=== In Sufism ===
The most important author of esoteric interpretation prior to the 11th century was Sulami (d. 1021 CE); without his work, most of the very early Sufi commentaries would not have been preserved. Sulami's major commentary was a book named haqaiq al-tafsir ("Truths of Exegesis"), a compilation of commentaries of earlier Sufis.

Sahl Tustari (d. 896) was among the most important mystics in the early formative period of Islamic mysticism. His commentary (tafsir al-Quran al-azim) was compiled later by his disciples and preserved, as a commentary on the Quran. Tustari's commentary does not comprise interpretations of every single verse, but there are comments on a selection of verses.

A Sufi commentary of the Quran is attributed to Ja'far al-Sadiq (Tafsir Imam Ja'far al-Sadiq), but its authenticity remains suspect. It conveys a spurious textual tradition and has little reliable material, but the items cited on Ja'far al-Sadiq's authority in Sulami's book appear to be based on identifiable chains of transmitters.

From the 11th century, several other works appear such as commentaries by Qushayri (d. 1074), Daylami (d. 1193), Shirazi (d. 1209), and Suhrawardi (d. 1234). These works include material from Sulami's books as well as the author's own contributions. Many works are written in Persian, such as the works of Maybudi (d. 1135) kashaf al-asrar ("the unveiling of the secrets").

Rumi (d. 1273) wrote a vast amount of mystical poetry in his book Mathnawi. Rumi makes heavy use of the Quran in his poetry, a feature that is sometimes omitted in translations of his work. Rumi's manner of incorporating Quranic verses into his poetry is notable in that he does not use them as prooftexts but intertwines Quranic verses with his poetry.

Simnani (d. 1336) wrote two influential works of esoteric exegesis on the Quran. He reconciled notions of God's manifestation through and in the physical world with the sentiments of Sunni Islam. Simnani was a prolific author, 154 titles are ascribed to him, of which at least 79 exist today.

Comprehensive Sufi commentaries appear in the 18th century such as the work of Ismail Hakki Bursevi (d. 1725). His work ruh al-Bayan ("The Spirit of Elucidation") is a voluminous exegesis. Written in Arabic, it combines the author's own ideas with those of his predecessors (notably, Ibn Arabi and Ghazali).

=== In Shiism ===
Shia Islam is a branch of Islam in which one finds some of the most esoteric interpretations on the nature of the Quran. Shia interpretations of the Quran concern mainly issues of authority where the concept of Imamat is paramount. In Twelver Shia Islam, there are two main theological schools: the Akhbari and the Usuli. The former school interprets the Quran mainly through reliance upon traditions (hadith) ascribed to the Imams. The latter school gives more power to independent reasoning and judgment (ijtihad). Ismaili interpretation shares common ground with Sufism. The method is called kashf, an "unveiling" to the heart of the interpreter, and it is dependent upon the master, the grace of God, and the spiritual capacity of the interpreter.

==== Ismailism ====
Several prominent Ismaili thinkers explained that ta’wil should be used to understand sharia law, sacred history and creation itself, as well as the anthropomorphic descriptions of God. Qadi al-Nu'man, a famous Ismaili Muslim jurist of the Fatimid period, believed that it is important to recognize and understand the symbolism behind the stories in the Quran based on certain verses that hint to an inner meaning, such as: "Thus your Lord will choose you and teach you the symbolic interpretation (ta’wil) of events (ahadith)" (Quran 12:21). Nasir-i Khusraw, a prominent Fatimid dignitary, explained that through revelation (tanzil), intellectual matters were transformed into a state that could be understood by humankind. Ta’wil is necessary to revert them to their original intellectual state. He also said that one must not be satisfied with the exoteric form but look for the person who can explain the original esoteric meaning to them. In saying this he alluded to the Imam of the Time. Al Mu’ayyad fi l-Din al-Shirazi, another prominent Ismaili thinker, further explains that ta’wil is what reunites the beginning (source) and the end (destination) of the circle of existence.

=== Validity of esoteric interpretations ===
There is almost no dispute among Muslims that the Quran has concealed meanings. However, not every esoteric interpretation of the Quran is necessarily valid. Some interpreters are known to have overplayed the allegorical aspects of the Quran by claiming privileged understanding of its contents and distorting its meaning. The authority of the person who extracts such meanings is also a matter of debate.

Mainstream theologians were willing to accept the interpretations if certain conditions were met. One of the most important criteria is that the interpretation should not conflict with what they considered the ‘literal’ meaning of the Quran. Suyuti (d. 1505 CE) believed that exegesis should be rigorous to avoid misunderstanding. Taftazani (d. 1390) believed that pure gnosis and perfection of faith can be achieved when the subtle allusions of the Quran are harmonized with the literal sense.

Kristin Zahra Sands, in the beginning of her introduction, asks questions:

- How can one begin to say what God "meant" by His revelation?
- How does one balance the desire to understand the meaning of the Quran with the realistic fear of reducing it to the merely human and individualistic?
- How, most basically, is one best to approach the Quran to discover its richness and transforming possibilities?

According to Sands, Quranic interpretation is an endless task and is different for each individual. Also, the language and the type of discourse that are chosen in interpretation varies in each commentator.

== See also ==
- Allegorical interpretation of the Bible
- Esotericism
- Hurufiyyah
- Isma'ilism
- Legal interpretation of the Quran
- Mount Qaf
- Muhkam and Mutashabih
- Muqaṭṭaʿāt
- Sufi philosophy
- Tafsir
- Alavi Bohras
