= Aliqa =

Aliqa العليقة
- Village
- Location in Syria
- Coordinates: 35°10′27″N 36°7′45″E
- Country: Syria
- Governorate: Tartus
- District: Baniyas District
- Subdistrict: Al-Annazah

Population (2004)
  - Total: 710
- Time zone: UTC+2 (EET)
  - Summer (DST): UTC+3 (EEST)
- City Qrya Pcode: C5392

Aliqa or Al-Ullayqah (Arabic: العليقة) is a Syrian village located in Baniyas District, Tartus. According to the Syria Central Bureau of Statistics (CBS), Aliqa had a population of 720 in the 2004 census. The village has Aleika Castle which dates back to the Nizari Ismaili state.
