= Aleika Castle =

Coordinates: 35°10′37″N 36°7′20″E

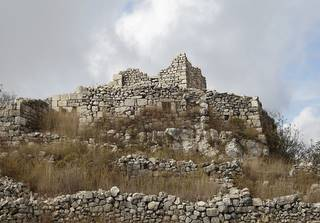
Aleika castle

Aleika Castle or Aliqa Castle (Arabic: قلعة العليقة) is located in Aliqa, approximately 85 km from Tartus. The castle consists of two concentric structures. Historically (12th century) it was under Syrian Nizari Isma'ili control, and was used during the crusades. Cemetery stones are found in the castle with Latin inscriptions, which confirms that fights took place here during the Crusades. The Mamluk Sultan Baibars is mentioned in the archives of the Syrian Tourism ministry.

== See also ==
- List of castles in Syria
- List of Ismaili castles
