= Zahir (Islam) =

Islamic term referring to outer meaning

Ẓāhir or zaher (Arabic: ظاهر) is an Arabic term in some tafsir (interpretations of the Quran) for what is external and manifest. Certain esoteric interpretations of Islam maintain that the Quran has an exoteric or apparent meaning, known as zahir, but also an underlying esoteric meaning, known as batin (baten), which can be interpreted only by a figure of esoteric knowledge. For Shi'a Muslims, the Imam of Time alone can understand the esoteric meaning.

In Sufism, the actions of an individual are the zahir, and the intention in the heart is the batin. Zahir is the world of bodies whereas batin is the world of souls. Sufis believe in the purification of the batin by their spiritual guide to assure a zahir that follows Shariat.

Zahir is also the underlying principle of the Ẓāhiriyya, a school of thought in Islamic jurisprudence and theology that relies only on the manifest or apparent meaning of expressions in the Quran and the Sunnah.

According to the "Epistle of the Right Path", a post-Mongol Persian-Ismaili treatise, the zahir (exoteric) form and the batin (esoteric) essence co-exist, in that the zahir (exoteric) form is the manifestation of the batin (esoteric) essence. The zahir (outer form) without the batin (essence) is just like a mirage or an illusion.

Many Ismaili Muslim thinkers have stressed the importance of the balance between the exoteric (ẓāhir) and the esoteric (batin) in the understanding of faith, and have explained that spiritual interpretation (ta’wil) entails elucidating the esoteric meaning (bātin) from the exoteric form (ẓāhir).
