= Batin (Islam) =

Islamic term referring to inner meaning

Bāṭin or baten (Arabic: باطن) literally means "inner", "inward", "hidden", etc. The Quran, for instance, has a hidden meaning in contrast to its exterior or apparent meaning, the zahir (zaher). Sufis believe that every individual has a batin in the world of souls. It is the inward self of the individual; when cleansed with the light of one's spiritual guide, it elevates a person spiritually. This notion is connected to Allah's attribute of the Hidden One, who cannot be seen but exists in every realm.

Many Ismaili Muslim thinkers have stressed the importance of the balance between the exoteric (zahir) and the esoteric (batin) in the understanding of faith, and have said that spiritual interpretation (ta’wil) entails elucidating the esoteric meaning (bātin) from the exoteric form (zahir).

Hence, early Muslim heresiographers identified Ismailis as Batiniyya, or Esotericists, due to their focus on the inner meaning. As mentioned above, comprehension of the faith is achieved through seeking and finding this inner meaning, therefore great emphasis is placed on the batin by Ismaili Pirs in their composition of ginans. According to Ismaili tradition, ginans are ‘supreme knowledge.’ Pirs convey an inner meaning within their ginans to spread knowledge of the faith to their believers. This exemplifies the significance of the balance between the exoteric (the literal meaning of the ginan), and the esoteric (hidden meaning of the ginan). The esoteric meaning is searched for to uncover this ‘supreme knowledge.’

In the Ismaili Muslim tradition, it is believed that the esoteric aspect of the faith can only be fully understood by the ahl al bayt – the family of Muhammad, who are in possession of this knowledge, or gnostic wisdom. It is conveyed only by the Imam of the time descended from Muhammad or his supreme representatives – the Pirs, hujjats, and those whom the Imams appoint.

In a wider sense, batin is the inner meaning or reality behind all existence, the zahir being the world of form and the apparent meaning.

A grounding feature of Ismailism is the co-existence of the physical and the spiritual, the zahir (exoteric) form and the batin (esoteric) essence. The esoteric is the source of the exoteric, and the exoteric is the manifestation of the esoteric. This concept is highlighted in the “Epistle of the Right Path”, a Persian Ismaili prose text from the post-Mongol period of Ismaili history, by an anonymous author.

== Batin as the basis for Taqiyyah for Ismailis ==
The Ismaili community, a minority within a minority, places significant emphasis on the esoteric aspects of Islam, known as batin. It shares this belief with many other Shia Muslims, Sufis, and others. Where there is hostility to esoteric understandings of Islam, this heightened focus on the faith’s inner dimensions creates a greater need for taqiyyah.

Ismailis and other esoterically-inclined Muslim communities employ taqiyyah to ensure the esoteric teachings are reserved only for those who are prepared to receive them. Taqiyyah entails that believers who possess esoteric knowledge conceal it knowledge from those who have not reached the same level of initiation.

The reasons for this concealment are twofold. Firstly, the unprepared recipient of such information may find it emotionally or mentally overwhelming, making it necessary to protect their well-being. Secondly, there is a risk that an uninitiated individual may misunderstand or reject the esoteric knowledge, causing them spiritual harm.

== See also ==
- Sufism
- Esotericism
- Esoteric interpretation of the Quran
- Batiniyya
- Ismailism
- Nizari
- Alawites
- Qarmatians
