= Mahrusah =

Mahrusah محروسة Mahrousa
- Village
- Location in Syria
- Coordinates: 35.161740°N 36.405087°E
- Country: Syria
- Governorate: Hama
- District: Masyaf
- Subdistrict: Jubb Ramlah

Population (2004)
  - Total: 6,579
- Time zone: UTC+3 (AST)

Mahrusah (Arabic: محروسة, also spelled Mahrousa) is a village in northern Syria, administratively part of the Hama Governorate, located west of Hama. Nearby localities include Jubb Ramlah to the north, Hanjur and Asilah to the northeast, Maarin to the east, Deir al-Salib to the southeast, Rabu to the south, Masyaf to the southwest and Deir Mama and al-Laqbah to the west. According to the Syria Central Bureau of Statistics, Mahrusah had a population of 6,579 in the 2004 census, making it the largest locality in the Jubb Ramlah subdistrict which consisted of 20 localities with a collective population of 39,814 in 2004. Its inhabitants are predominantly Alawites.
