= Masyaf =

City in northwestern Syria

Masyaf مصياف
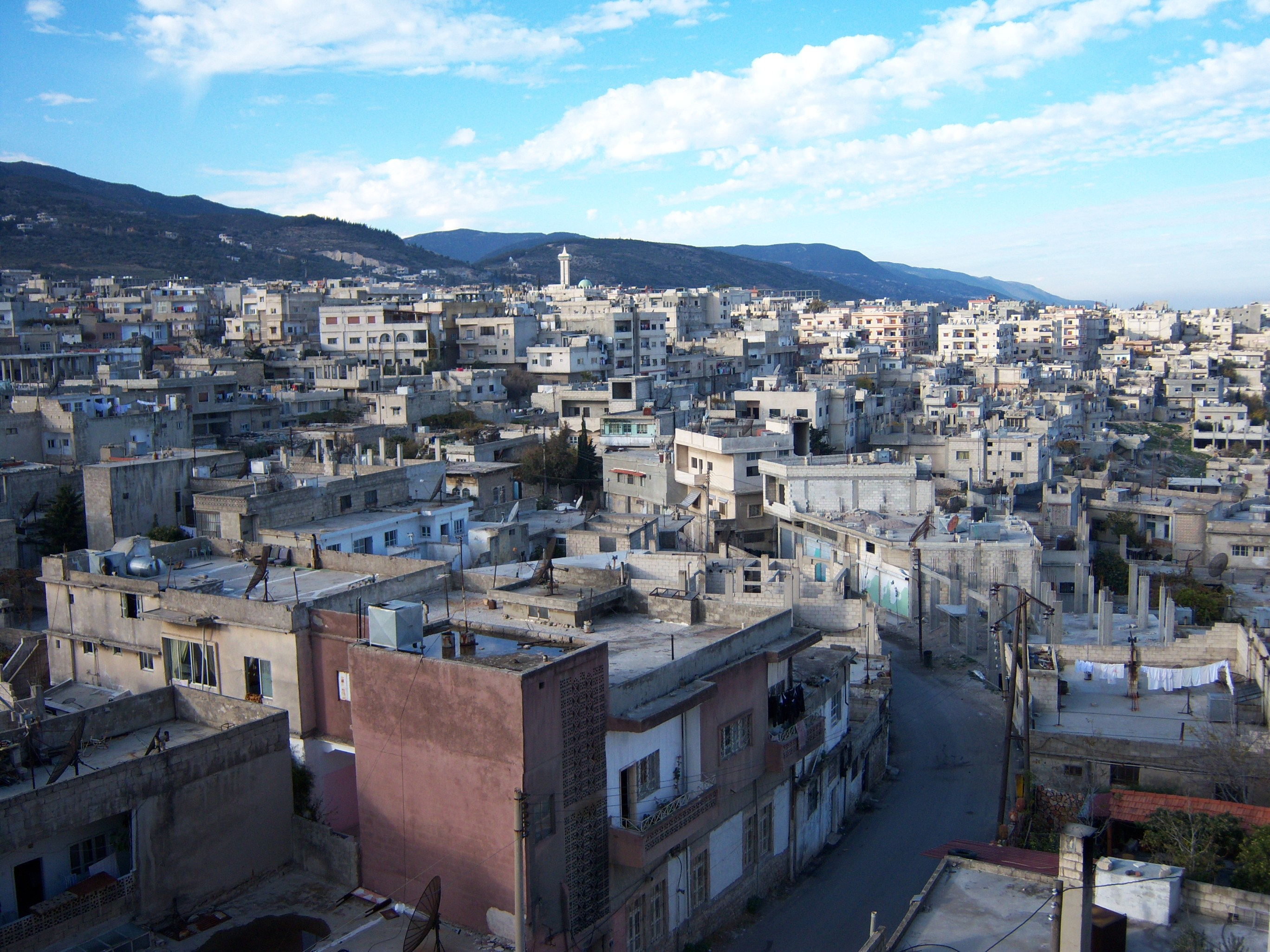
- A view of Masyaf, 2008

- Location in Syria
- Coordinates: 35°03′55″N 36°20′32″E
- Country: Syria
- Governorate: Hama
- District: Masyaf
- Subdistrict: Masyaf
- Elevation: 447 m (1,467 ft)

Population (2004)
  - Total: 22,508
- Time zone: UTC+3 (AST)

Masyaf (Arabic: مصياف Miṣyāf) is a city in northwestern Syria. It is the center of the Masyaf District in the Hama Governorate. As of 2004, Masyaf had a religiously diverse population of approximately 22,000 Ismailis, Alawites and Christians. The city is well known for its large medieval castle, particularly its role as the headquarters of the Nizari Ismailis and their elite Assassins unit.

== Etymology ==
Throughout the Islamic era and until the modern day, the Arabic name of the city was pronounced in a number of different ways by the inhabitants of the region as Maṣyaf, Maṣyat or Maṣyad. The Arabic name is a local pronunciation that evolved from the Assyrian name Manṣuate. The "nṣw" in Manṣuate correlates with the Arabic "nṣṣ", which means "to set up", according to orientalist scholar Edward Lipinsky. Moreover, Lipinsky suggests that the Assyrian name was likely a configuration of the Assyrian word manṣuwatu which correlates with the Arabic word minaṣṣatu(n), both of which translate as "raised platform". This translation is indicative of the promontory that the Masyaf fortress occupies which overlooks the rest of the city and the surrounding area.

== History ==
=== Early history ===
Masyaf is the most probable site of the ancient Aramean city of Mansuate that existed in the 8th century BC. It later served as the administrative center of an Assyrian province by the same name in modern-day central Syria. Masyaf is also likely the site of Marsyas. Roman and Byzantine historians mentioned a city named "Marsyas" that governed the al-Ghab and Beqaa plains to the north and south of the site, respectively.

Masyaf and its fortress were first mentioned by Crusader chroniclers in 1099. However, because a fortification at Masyaf likely existed prior to the 11th century, it is probable that the Aleppo-based Hamdanid dynasty built a fort at Masyaf, due to its position as an outpost overlooking the mountain roads. At that time, the fortress was a part of Jund Qinnasrin (Chalcis Province) of the Fatimid Caliphate. In the autumn of 999, Basil II, the Byzantine emperor, destroyed the fortifications at Masyaf as part of his campaign to gain control of Antioch and its environs from the Muslims.

The area would later come under Seljuk rule, but in 1099, the Crusaders attempted to wrest control of Masyaf (and the more strategically important Rafania) following their capture of Tripoli. The Seljuk atabeg of Damascus, Toghtekin, launched a military campaign to prevent the loss of the area and reached a short-lived accommodation with the Crusaders whereby Masyaf and Hisn al-Akrad would remain in Muslim hands, but have to pay tribute to the Crusaders. Sometime later, Masyaf was controlled by the Mirdasid dynasty. In 1127, the Mirdasids sold it to the Shaizar-based Banu Munqidh family.

=== Nizari Ismaili era ===
In 1140, Masyaf was captured by the Nizari Ismailis, a sect of Ismaili branch of Shia. The fortress was being defended by a Banu Munqidh mamluk (slave warrior) named Sunqur, who the Ismaili force managed to ambush and kill. The Ismailis had chosen Syria as their new home and successively settled in the cities of Aleppo and Damascus and the fortress of Banias, each time being persecuted and massacred by the authorities or mobs of local residents incited by clerics who accused the Ismailis of being heretics or causing problems. Consequently, the surviving Ismaili leadership decided that establishing bases in Syria's cities and thus relying on the goodwill of various umara (princes) was untenable. Instead, they chose to settle in Jabal Ansariyah, a coastal mountain range dotted with fortresses, including Masyaf.

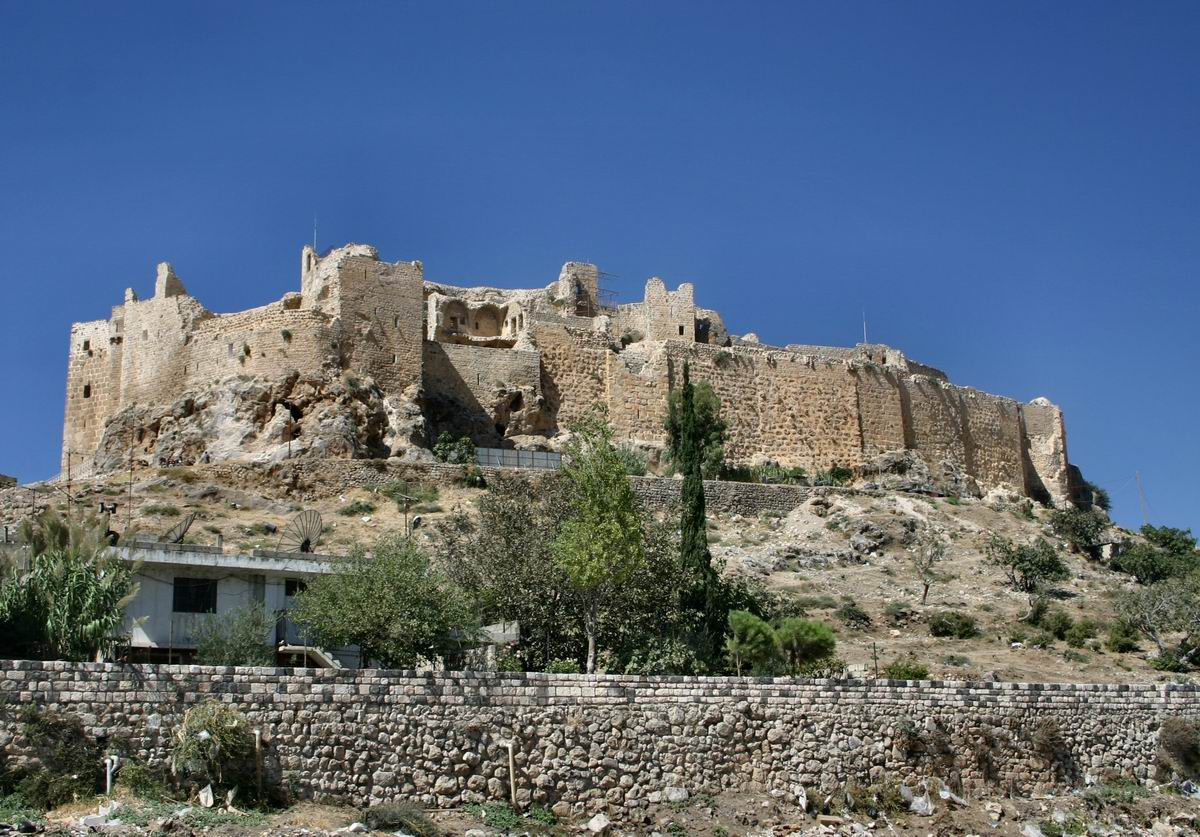
The fortress of Masyaf

Following its capture, Masyaf served as the principal fortress for the Ismailis' chief da'i. Together with other fortresses acquired at around the same time, including al-Kahf, Khawabi, al-Qadmus and al-Rusafa, the Ismailis were able to carve an autonomous territory for themselves amid hostile Crusader states and local Muslim dynasties nominally affiliated with the Abbasid Caliphate. Masyaf served as the headquarters of the Ismaili da'i Rashid ad-Din Sinan and his elite unit of fida'i who were known as the Assassins.

In the mid-1170s, the Ayyubid sultan Saladin set about conquering Syria, ousting the Crusaders and uniting the Muslim world under Sunni Islam. The Ismailis considered Saladin a more dangerous threat than the Crusaders and allied with Saladin's rival in Aleppo to defeat the Ayyubids. Sinan's men launched two unsuccessful attempts to assassinate Saladin and in 1176, Saladin launched a punitive expedition against the Assassins in the strongly-defended fortress of Masyaf. Within a few days of the siege, Saladin withdrew due to an urgent need to redeploy against the Crusaders who were attacking Ayyubid territory in the Beqaa. He arranged a truce with Sinan mediated by the Ayyubid emir of Hama, Shihab al-Din Mahmud al-Harimi, Saladin's uncle.

=== Mamluk rule ===
A wall around the town of Masyaf was built in 1249 by the Persian leader of the Ismailis, Taj al-Din Abu'l Futuh. In 1260, the Mongols under Hulagu conquered most of northern Syria and briefly occupied Masyaf. However, following the Mongols' rout at the Battle of Ain Jalut at the hand of the Bahri Mamluks later that year, they withdrew from Masyaf and it once again fell under Ismaili control.

In 1262, Masyaf's rulers were ordered to pay tribute to the Mamluk sultan Baibars and some time after, the sultan had Masyaf's emir Najm al-Din Ismail replaced by Sarim al-Din Mubarak. Mubarak was later imprisoned in Cairo by Baibars and Najm ad-Din was briefly restored as emir before Masyaf was fully incorporated into the sultanate in 1270. Ismailis continued inhabiting it throughout Mamluk rule. Towards the end of the century, Masyaf became a major stopping point on the Mamluk postal route and was controlled by a commander who answered directly to the sultan due to its strategic role as a frontier fortress.

In 1320, the historian and Ayyubid emir of Hama, Abu'l Fida, noted that Masyaf was a "center of the Ismailian Doctrine" and that it was "beautiful" with gardens and a spring from which flowed a small stream. According to Ibn Battuta, who passed by the town in 1355, Masyaf was the center of a district belonging to the province of Tripoli and containing the fortress villages of al-Rusafa, al-Kahf, al-Qadmus, al-Ulayqa and al-Maniqa. Masyaf was later separated from Tripoli and transferred to the authority of Damascus province. In the mid-15th century, under Sultan Barsbay, a road was built that connected Masyaf with Tripoli, but the postal route no longer passed through the town. In 1446, the historian Khalil al-Zahiri described Masyaf as "a pleasant town, with an extensive countryside".

=== Ottoman era ===
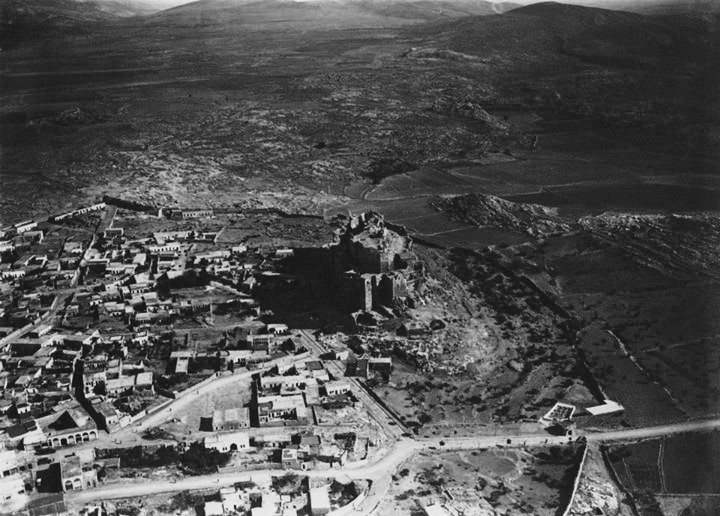
The fortress and town of Masyaf, c. 1935

Masyaf, along with the rest of Syria, was incorporated into the Ottoman Empire in 1516–17 following the Ottoman victory over the Mamluks at the Battle of Marj Dabiq. Masyaf became a part of the liwa (district) of Homs, and along with the other Ismaili fortresses in its vicinity (qala' al-da'wa), was responsible for paying a special tax. The town had a khan (caravanserai) which paid tolls to the Ottoman authorities. The tolls were abolished later in the mid-16th century. According to the Sufi traveler Abd al-Ghani al-Nabulsi, the emir of Masyaf in the early 1690s was a descendant of the Arab Tanukh tribe named Sulayman.

In 1703, the Raslan clan, an Alawite tribe, took over Masyaf and controlled it for about eight years until it was restored to the Ismailis following the intervention of the Ottoman authorities. During this period, the majority of Masyaf's Ismaili inhabitants followed the Nizari sect although there was a small Tayyibi minority too. In 1788, the emir of Masyaf, Mustafa ibn Idris, built a sabil (ablutions fountain) and a house that would be used by himself and successive Ismaili emirs.

In 1808, the Raslan clan led by Sheikh Mahmud Raslan attacked Masyaf, killing its Ismaili chief, Mustafa Milhim, and his son, and captured the fortress. About 300 of the town's Ismaili inhabitants were also killed, while many others, including the da'i (religious chief) of Masyaf, fled for Homs, Hama and other areas in central Syria, settling in those places temporarily. The Ismailis had already been in the process of being gradually expelled from Jabal Ansariyah by Alawite clans. The Ottoman governor of Damascus, Kunj Yusuf Pasha, intervened in the matter, dispatching a force of 4,000–5,000 soldiers to recapture the town. After three months of fighting, the Raslans surrendered Masyaf. Ismaili control over the town and its fortress was restored in 1810.

Two years after the resettlement of Masyaf by the Ismailis, Johann Ludwig Burckhardt recorded an estimated population of 280 families, most of which were Ismaili and 30 were Christian. Burchardt noted that the town's citadel, many houses, the mosque and most other buildings were either heavily damaged or destroyed from previous fighting. Throughout the remainder of the 19th century, Masyaf's population continued to decrease.

=== Modern era ===
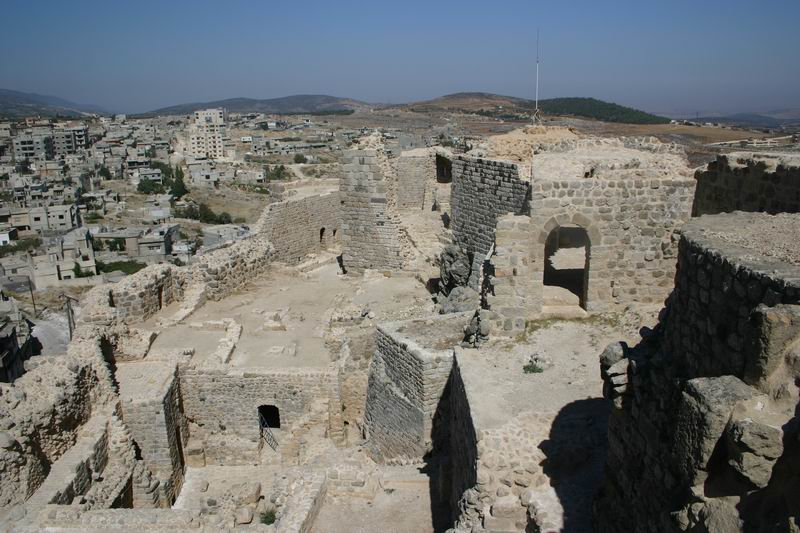
A view of part of the fortress (foreground) and the modern city of Masyaf (background), 2004

The Allied Powers captured Syria from the Ottomans in 1917, after which the residents largely abandoned the fortress of Masyaf. British general T. E. Lawrence rested in Masyaf and remarked that the fortress was being used as a poorhouse at the time. During the French Mandate over Syria, the French separated the Jabal Ansariyah range from the rest of Syria to form the Alawite State. Masyaf was made a part of the State of Damascus, but in 1929, a number of rural Alawite villages in its immediate vicinity, including al-Rusafa, al-Bayyadiyah, Akakir, Maryamin and Abu Qubays, were ceded to the Alawite State. The latter merged with the rest of Syria in 1936. In 1939, Masyaf and its district was transferred from the Province of Hama to the Province of Latakia. Throughout the 1930s, rooms in the fortress were still being used by local residents.

In 1947, a year after Syria became independent from France, 3,808 Ismailis were recorded to be living in Masyaf. The Syrian government under President Amin al-Hafiz established Masyaf as a center for carpet weaving in 1965. The weaving workshops mostly employed women. In the 1960s, Masyaf's Ismaili community largely identified with the Nasserist movement, in contrast to the Alawites who dominated the surrounding villages who were mostly associated with the Baathists.

In 1970, much of the town of Masyaf still remained within the confines of the city walls. However, by 1998, its population and urban space had expanded considerably outside the walls. The fortress is situated in the northeastern part of Masyaf's old city. The walls remained in place, but the homes and gardens of local residents were built immediately alongside them. Within the walls is a mosque dating to the 12th century and according to local residents, is associated with Saladin. The fortress is considered a national monument and is directly under the authority of the Syrian Directorate of Antiquities.

In the Syrian Civil War after 2015, an alleged missile production facility in Masyaf and a base near the town, thought to be used by Iranian forces and militias, became repeatedly targets of airstrikes attributed to Israel.

On 8 September 2024, Israel launched a series of airstrikes as well as a ground raid by the Shaldag unit, targeting an underground precision missile factory reportedly built by Iran.

== Geography ==
Masyaf is situated along the foothills of the eastern slopes of the Jabal Ansariyah coastal mountain range. The average elevation of Masyaf is 485 meters. It is just west of the al-Ghab Plain. The area is marked by gardens, orchards and fields of wheat and barley which are cultivated by local residents. To the north and south of Masyaf flow seasonal streams which feed into a tributary of the Orontes River, called al-Sarout.

The city of Hama is 45 kilometers to the east and Baniyas is 54 kilometers to the west. Hama is connected to the town via a road north of Masyaf which passes through al-Laqbah and Deir Shamil. Nearby villages include al-Rusafa to the southeast, al-Bayda to the south, al-Suwaydah to the southwest, Rabu to the west, Biqraqa to the northwest, Hurayf and Hayalin to the north, Zaynah to the northeast and al-Shiha to the east.

=== Climate ===
Masyaf has a hot-summer Mediterranean climate (Köppen climate classification Csa). In winter there is much more rainfall in Masyaf than in summer. The average annual temperature in Masyaf is 17.6 °C (63.7 °F). About 1,049 mm (41.30 in) of precipitation falls annually.

Climate data for Masyaf
Month	Jan	Feb	Mar	Apr	May	Jun	Jul	Aug	Sep	Oct	Nov	Dec	Year
Mean daily maximum °C (°F)	11.6 (52.9)	13.2 (55.8)	16.8 (62.2)	21.9 (71.4)	26.5 (79.7)	30.8 (87.4)	32.2 (90.0)	32.8 (91.0)	31.0 (87.8)	26.5 (79.7)	10.0 (50.0)	13.3 (55.9)	22.2 (72.0)
Mean daily minimum °C (°F)	4.1 (39.4)	5.0 (41.0)	7.1 (44.8)	10.0 (50.0)	13.8 (56.8)	17.9 (64.2)	20.8 (69.4)	20.9 (69.6)	17.7 (63.9)	13.6 (56.5)	9.1 (48.4)	5.6 (42.1)	12.1 (53.8)
Average precipitation mm (inches)	212 (8.3)	189 (7.4)	165 (6.5)	85 (3.3)	30 (1.2)	4 (0.2)	0 (0)	1 (0.0)	10 (0.4)	42 (1.7)	89 (3.5)	222 (8.7)	1,049 (41.3)
Source: Climate-Data.org, Climate data

== Demographics ==
According to the Syria Central Bureau of Statistics, Masyaf had a population of 22,508 in the 2004 census. It is the administrative center of the Masyaf District and the Masyaf Subdistrict. The latter had a population of 68,184 in 2004. In the mid-1940s, its inhabitants were predominantly Ismailis. Today, it is a religiously mixed city of Ismailis and Alawites, with a Christian minority.

== In popular culture ==
Masyaf is featured as the base of operations of the Assassin Order during the Third Crusade in the Assassin's Creed games series (mainly in Assassin's Creed and Assassin's Creed: Revelations). The village appears built on a rock, with the Masyaf fortress at the top.

== Gallery ==
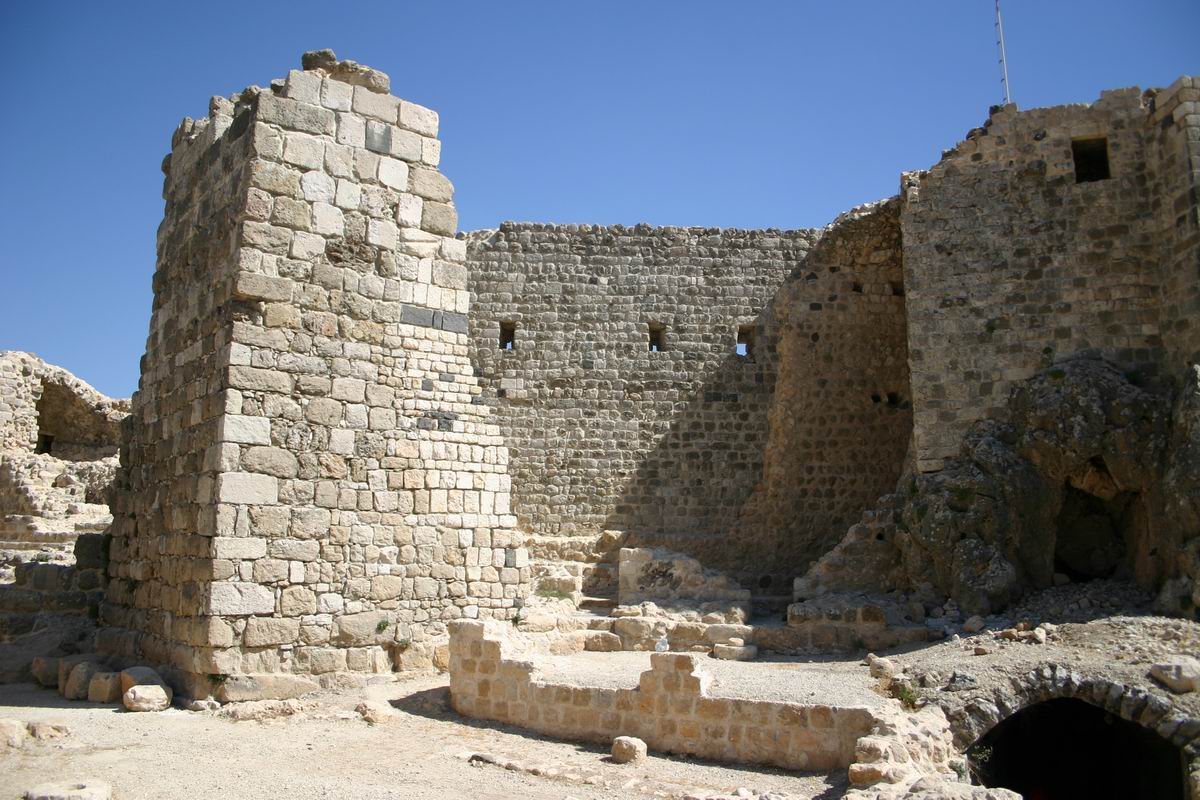

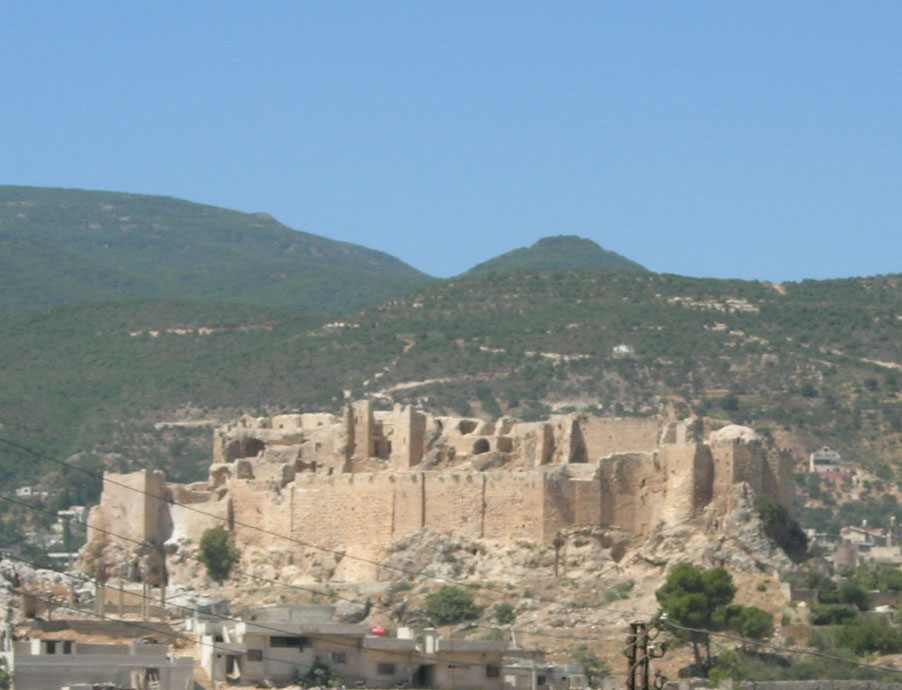

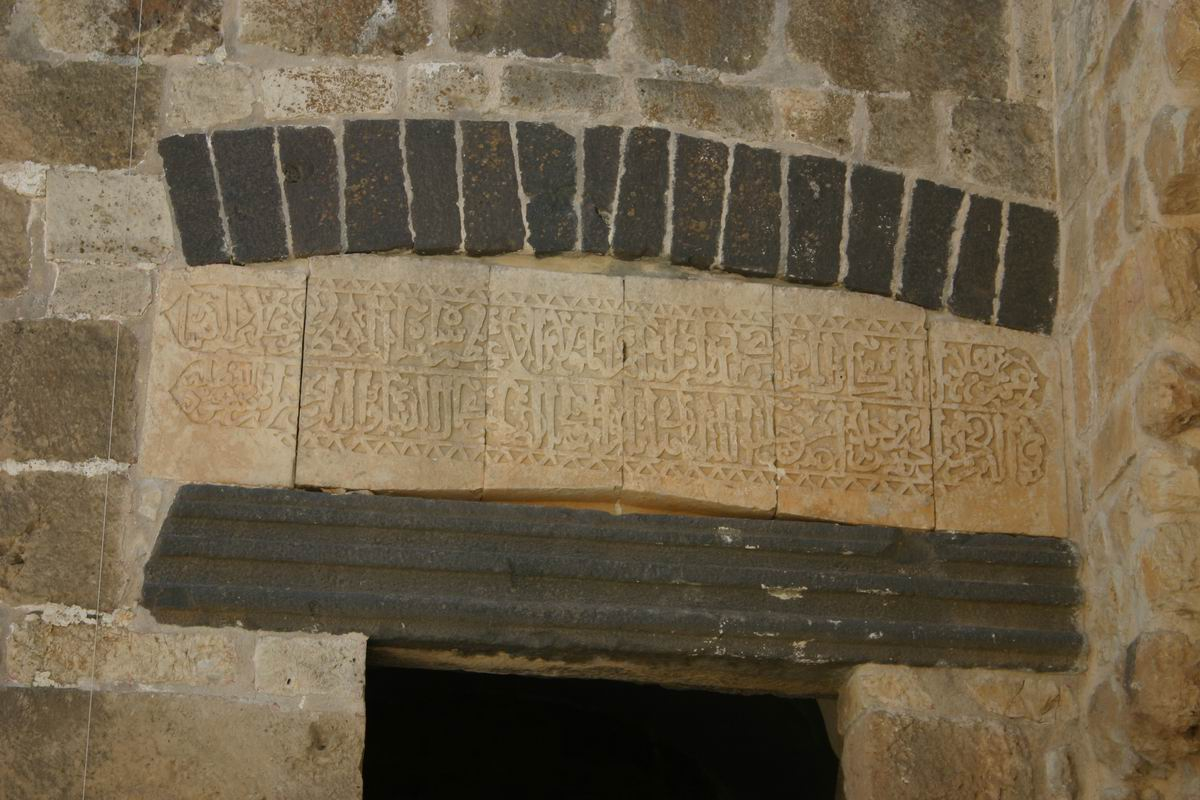

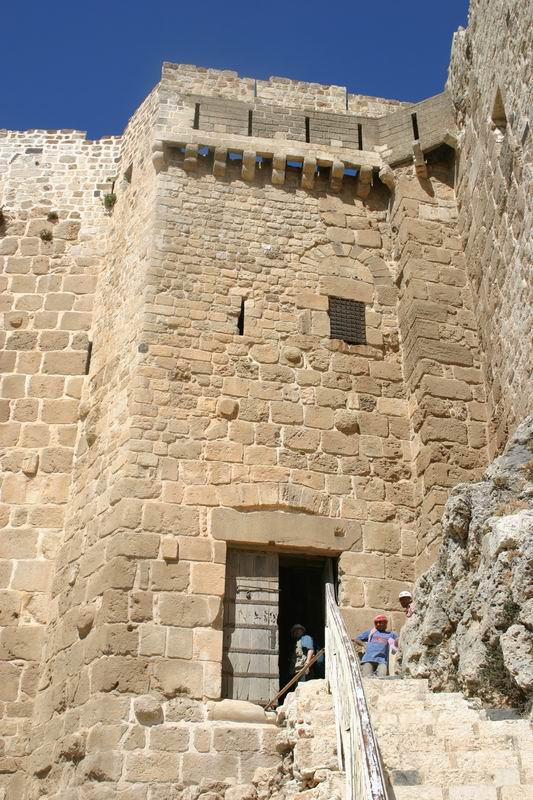

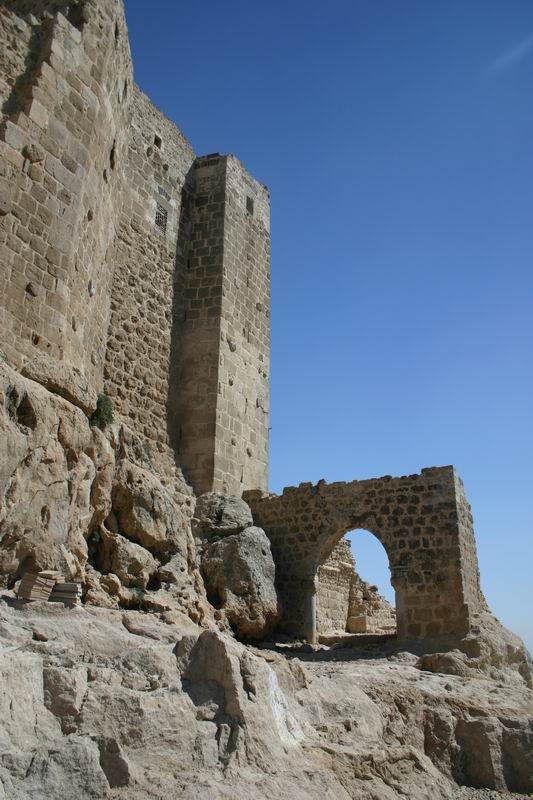

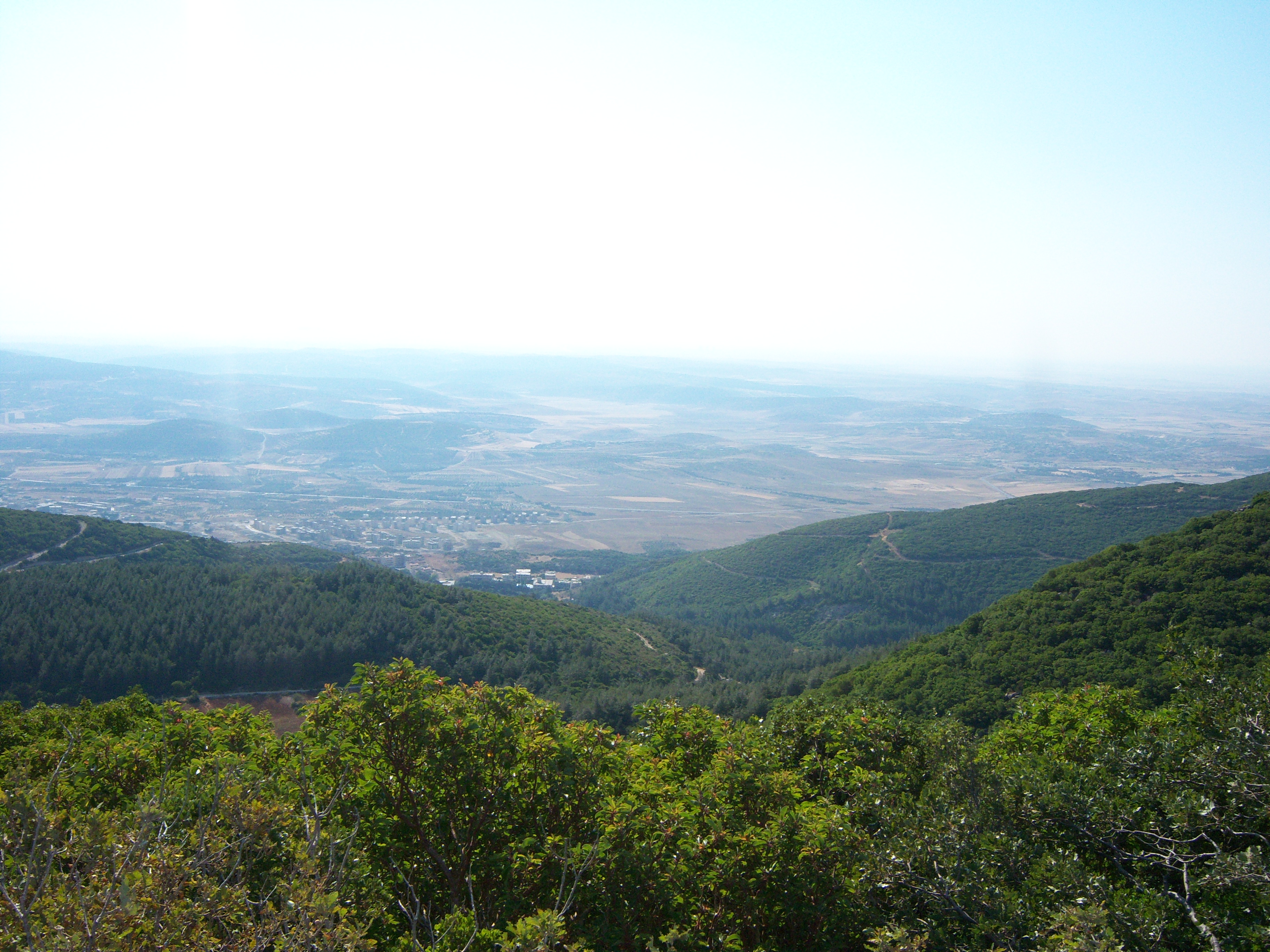
View of Masyaf from the mountain, summer of 2009

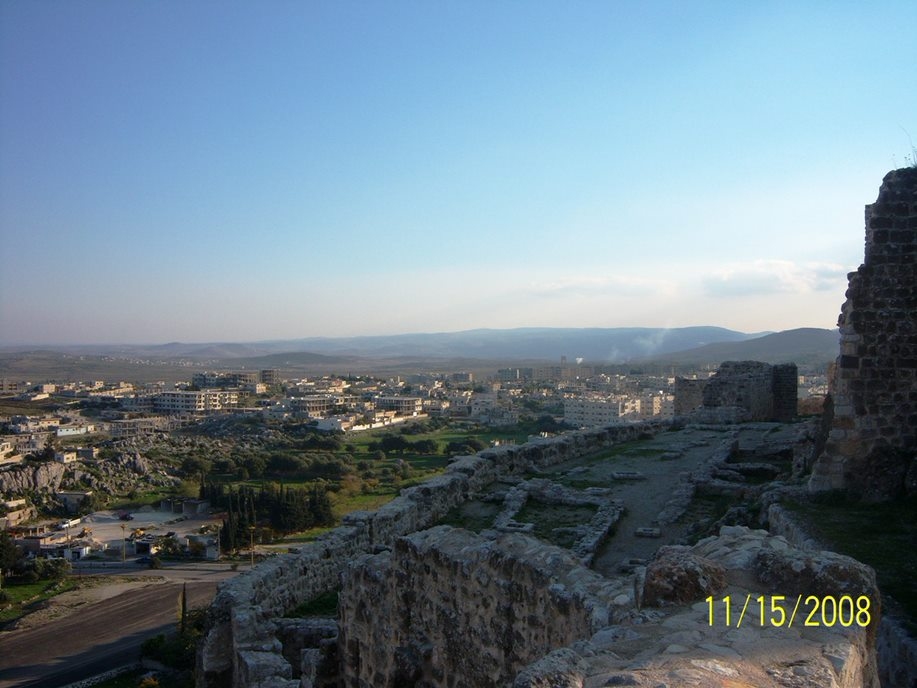
Masyaf Castle

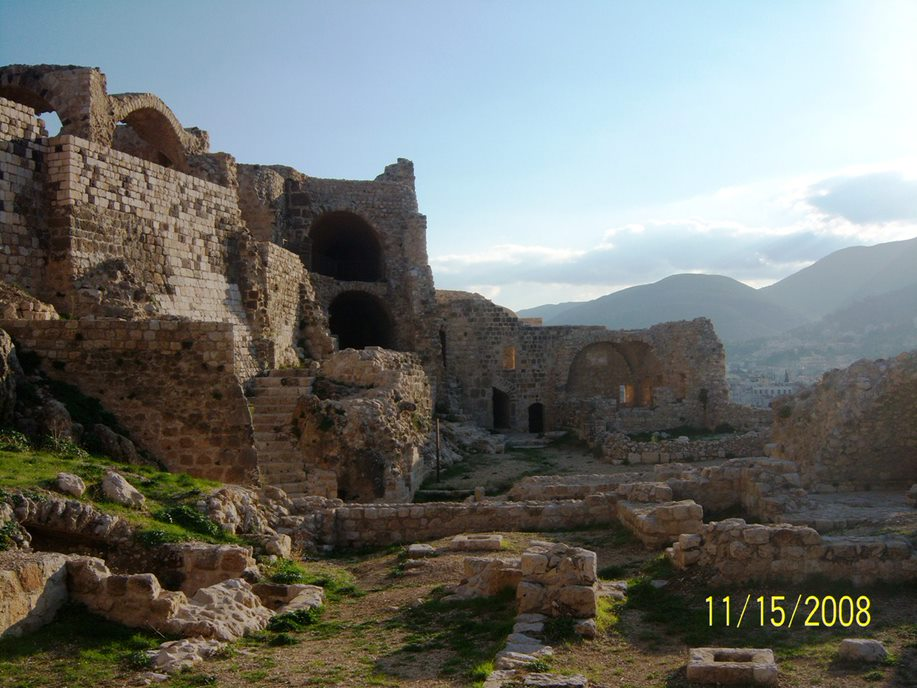
Masyaf Castle

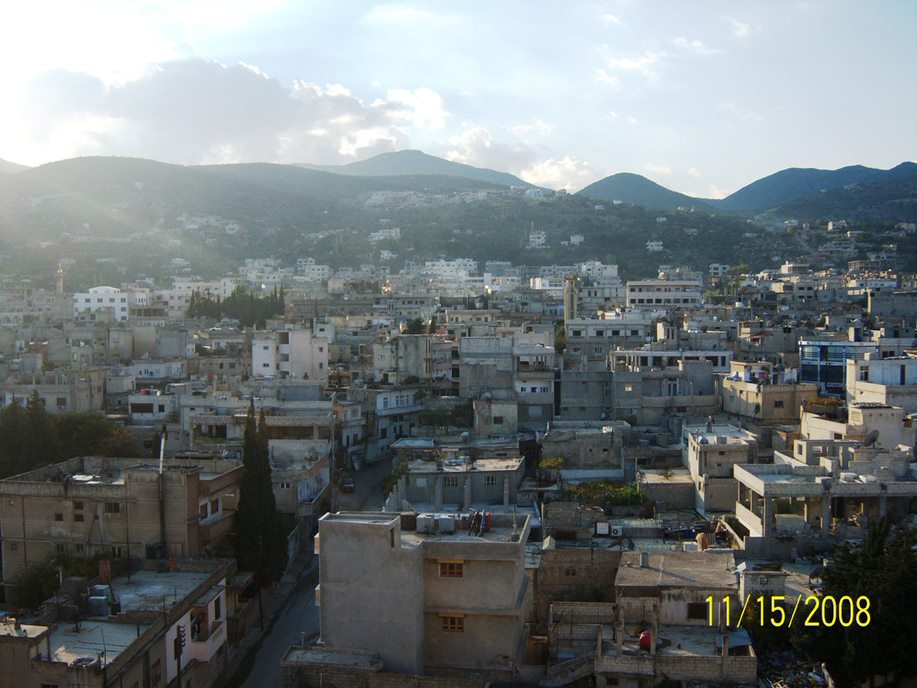
Masyaf from the Castle

== Bibliography ==
- Balanche, Fabrice (2006), La région alaouite et le pouvoir syrien (PDF) (in French), Karthala Editions, ISBN 2845868189
- Daftary, Farid (2011), Historical Dictionary of the Ismailis, Scarecrow Press, ISBN 9780810879706
- Daftary, Farid (2007), The Isma'ilis: Their History and Doctrines, Cambridge University Press, ISBN 9781139465786
- Hasan, Haytham (2008). The Citadel of Masyaf (PDF). The Aga Khan Trust for Culture. p. 46. ISBN 9782940212064. Archived from the original (PDF) on 2015-12-08.
- Honigman, E. (1 January 1989). "Masyad". In Bosworth, Clifford Edward (ed.). The Encyclopaedia of Islam: Fascicules 111–112: Masrah Mawlid. Brill Publishers. ISBN 9789004092396.
- Le Strange, Guy (1890). Palestine Under the Moslems: A Description of Syria and the Holy Land from A.D. 650 to 1500. London: Committee of the Palestine Exploration Fund. OCLC 1004386.
- Lipinsky, Edward (2000). The Aramaeans: Their Ancient History, Culture, Religion. Peeters Publishers. p. 30. ISBN 9042908599.
- Mirza, Nasser Ahmad (1997), Syrian Ismailism: The Ever Living Line of the Imamate, AD 1100–1260, Psychology Press, ISBN 9780700705054
- Willey, Peter (2005). The Eagle's Nest: Ismaili Castles in Iran and Syria. I.B.Tauris. p. 220. ISBN 9781850434641.
