= Al-Rusafa, Syria =

Al-Rusafa الرصافة Rassafah, Rosafah, Resafi
- Village
- Location in Syria
- Coordinates: 35°1′59″N 36°18′9″E
- Country: Syria
- Governorate: Hama
- District: Masyaf
- Subdistrict: Masyaf

Population (2004)
  - Total: 1,608
- Time zone: UTC+3 (AST)
- City Qrya Pcode: C3360

Al-Rusafa (Arabic: الرصافة Ruṣāfa, also spelled Rassafah, Rosafah or Resafi) is a Syrian village located in the Masyaf Subdistrict in Masyaf District, located west of Hama and about 10 kilometers southwest of Masyaf. According to the Syria Central Bureau of Statistics (CBS), al-Rusafa had a population of 1,608 in the 2004 census. Its inhabitants are predominantly Alawites. It is the site of a former Ismaili fortress.

== Fortress ==
At the northern edge of the village is the fortress of al-Rusafa, which is situated on a hill 60 meters higher than the village itself. The fortress is largely preserved, although it is mostly covered by trees and vegetation. In the medieval period, it acted as a subsidiary fortress for the main Ismaili fortress of Masyaf. At its largest extent, it measures roughly 75 meters by 30 meters and is oval-shaped. The fortress was constructed from stone from local quarries and it consists of three stories.

The entrance in the northwestern section of the fortress is guarded by a tower. The outer walls are dominated by galleries and chambers, which presumably played the role of battlements. The lowest floor contains several storage rooms, a number of which were built 20 meters deep into the ground. The middle area of al-Rusafa is marked by the extensive presence of vaulted rooms. Although ruined, the central towers "are still high" according to Peter Willey, an authority on Ismaili castles.

== History ==
Al-Rusafa was taken over by the Nizari Ismailis around 1140 CE along with other fortresses in the vicinity, namely Masyaf, Khawabi, al-Maniqa and Qulay'a. The fortress was rebuilt by the Ismaili da'i (chief) Rashid ad-Din Sinan in the 1160s. It is possible that another fortress stood in its place prior to the Ismaili conquest. In May 1271, the Mamluk sultan Baibars besieged and captured al-Rusafa from the Ismailis.

In the mid-1960s, al-Rusafa was a small village that contained an old khan (caravanserai) in addition to its partially ruined fortress.

== Gallery ==
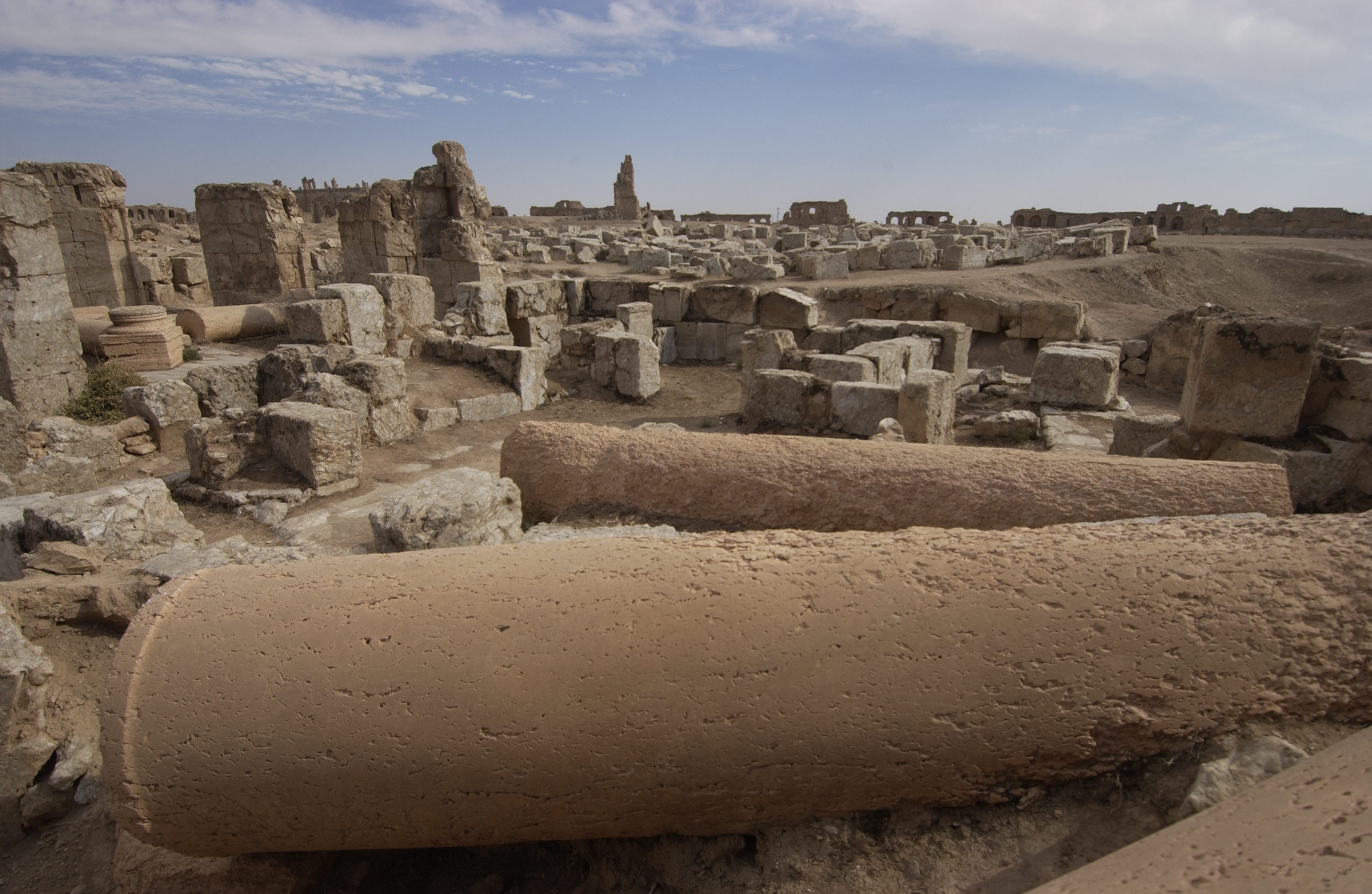

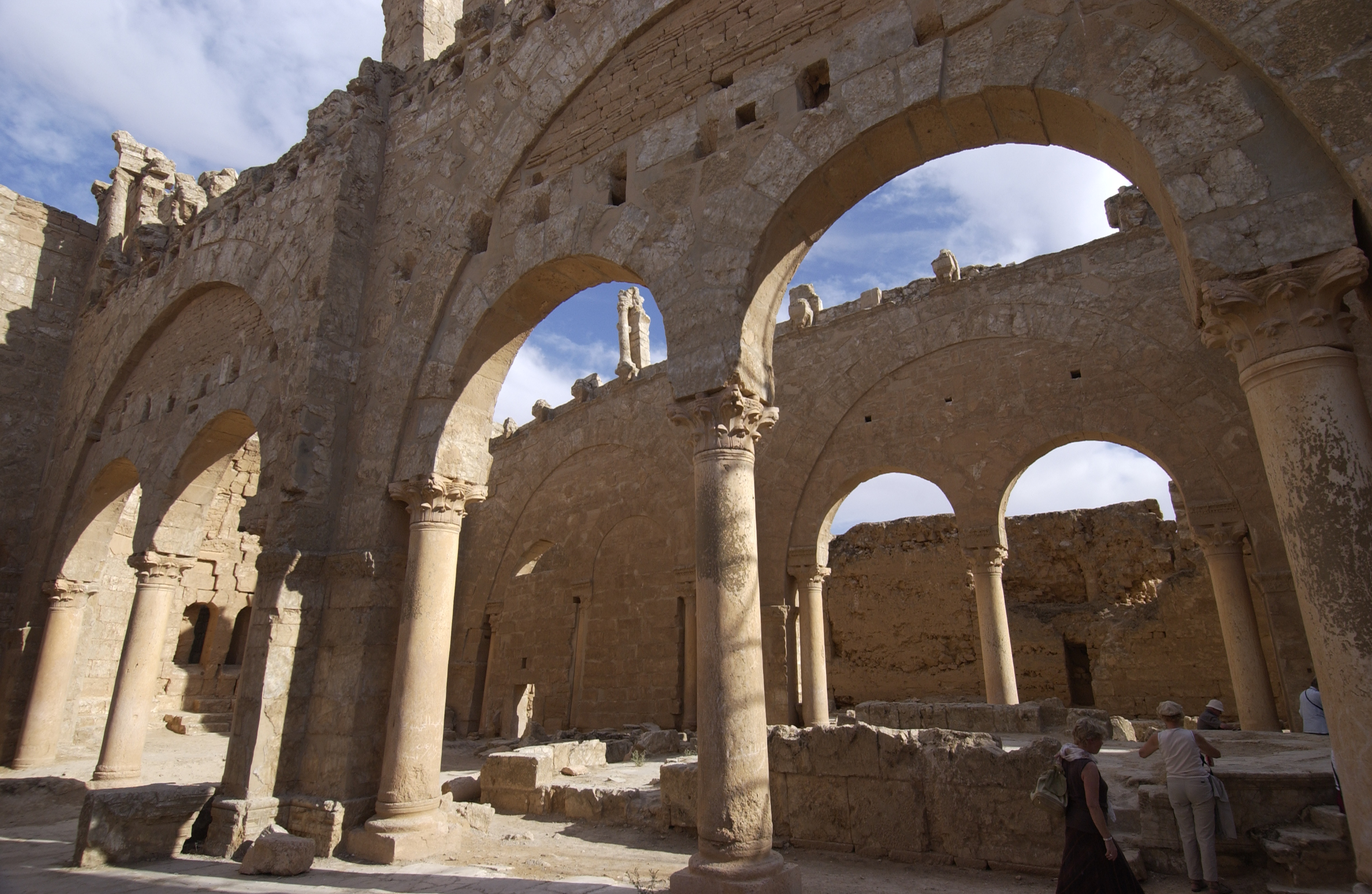

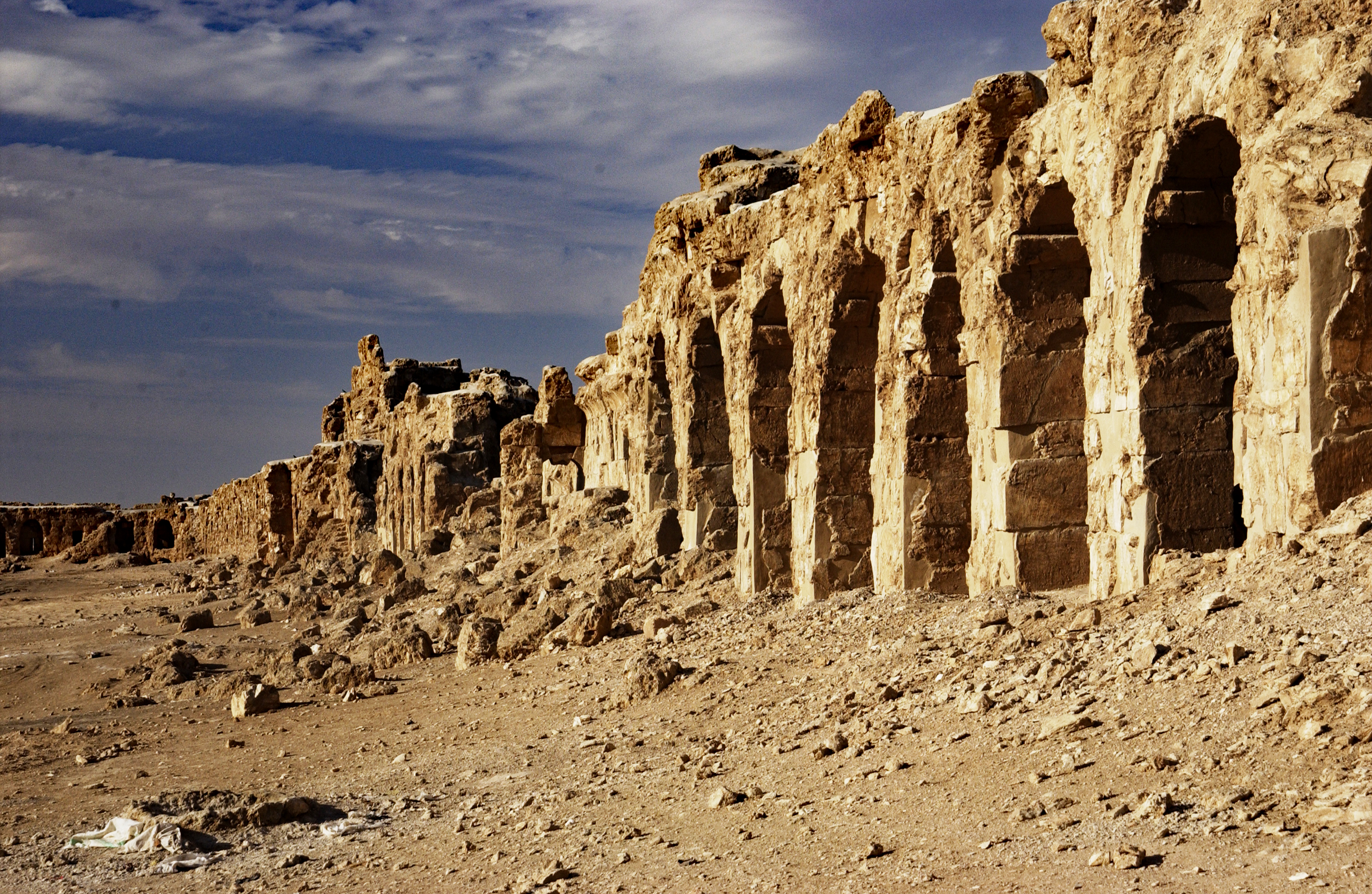

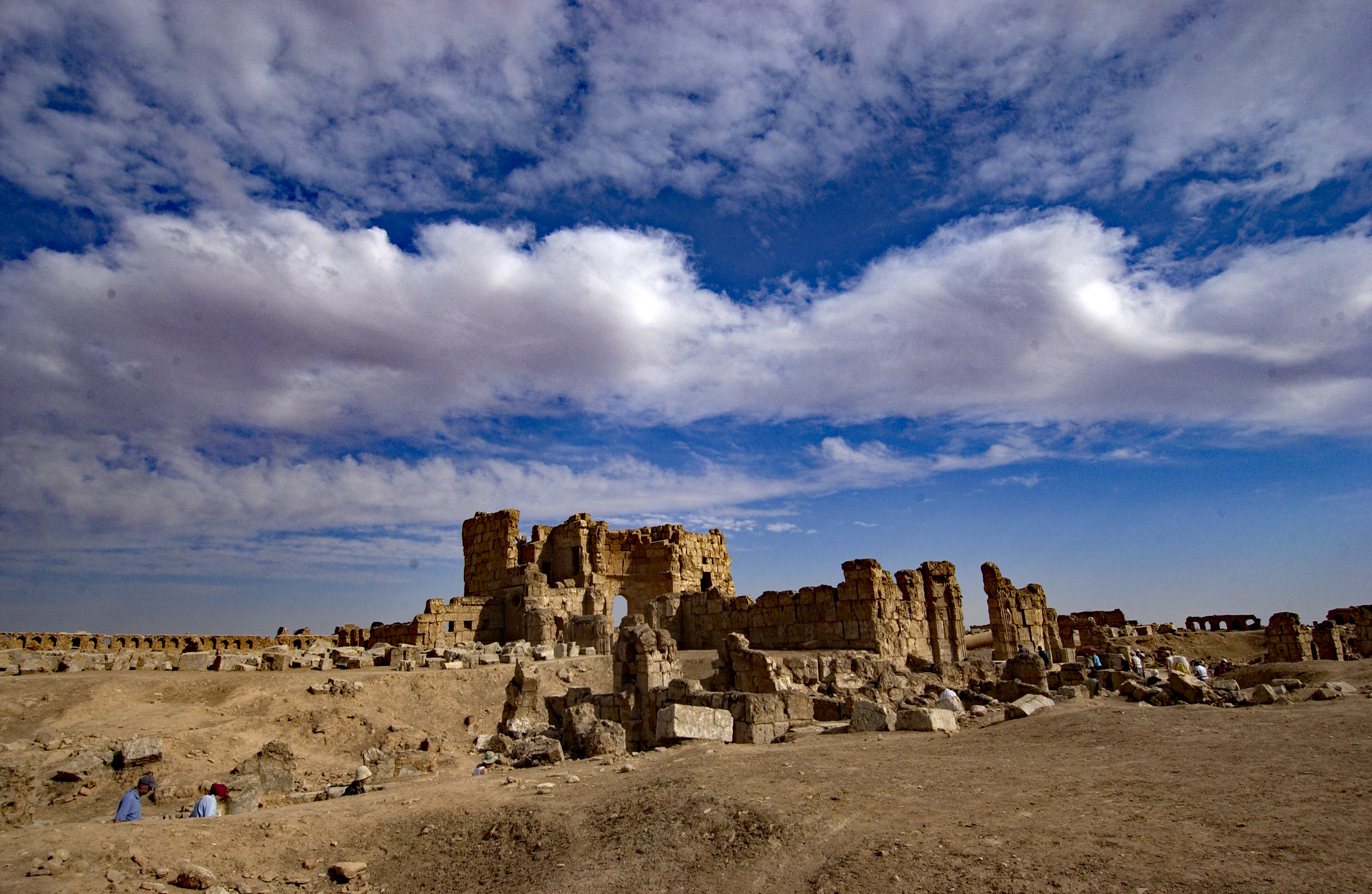

== Bibliography ==
- Boulanger, Robert (1966), Moyen-Orient: Liban, Syrie, Jordanie, Iraq, Iran (in French), Hachette
- Daftary, Farid (2007), The Isma'ilis: Their History and Doctrines, Cambridge University Press, ISBN 9781139465786
- Willey, Peter (2005), The Eagle's Nest: Ismaili Castles in Iran and Syria, I.B.Tauris, ISBN 9781850434641
