= Deir Mama =

Deir Mama دير ماما Dayr Mama
- Village
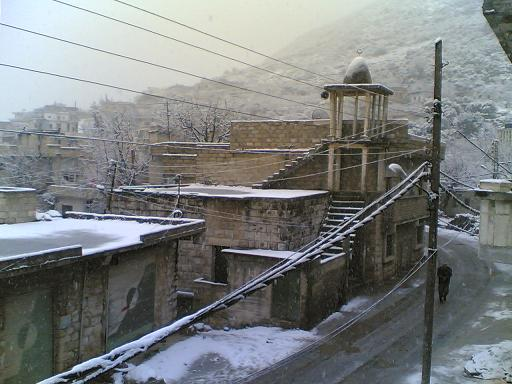
- Deir Mama in the winter, 2007

- Location in Syria
- Coordinates: 35°8′25″N 36°19′50″E
- Country: Syria
- Governorate: Hama
- District: Masyaf
- Subdistrict: Masyaf

Population (2004)
  - Total: 2,985
- Time zone: UTC+3 (AST)

Deir Mama (Arabic: دير ماما, romanized: Dayr Māmā) is a village in northwestern Syria, administratively part of the Hama Governorate. It is located 35 kilometers (22 mi) west of Hama along the eastern foothills of the Syrian Coastal Mountain Range. The village may have been one of the earliest rural areas in Syria where Alawites lived, i.e. before Mamluk rule in the mid-13th century. It was historically well known in Syria for its local silk industry, though it has dwindled in recent years. Deir Mama had a population of nearly 3,000 in 2004 and the inhabitants are Alawites and Christians.

== Geography ==
Deir Mama stretches along the eastern foothills of the Syrian Coastal Mountain Range, with an average elevation of 550 meters (1,800 ft) above sea level. The village overlooks the Ghab Plain to its east. It lies on the road between Masyaf, to its south, and al-Laqbah, to its north. To the west of Deir Mama is the village of Mahrusah and to its immediate south is Hurayf.

== Population ==
According to the Syria Central Bureau of Statistics (CBS), Deir Mama had a population of 2,985 in the 2004 census. The estimated population in 2014 was 8,500. The village has a religiously mixed population of Alawites and Christians, with Alawites forming the majority. The principal families in the village are the Isber, Abbas, As'ad, Wannous, Mahmoud, Barakat, Haidar, Makhlouf and Raslan. Beginning in the 1900s, but accelerating between 1920 and 1935, a wave of emigrants from Deir Mama settled in Argentina.

Among Deir Mama's notable natives is the novelist Mamdouh Adwan and the first female physician in Masyaf District, Raisa Abdullah. Alawites and Christians share a shrine that each group worships. Alawites refer to it as Sheikh Sobeh while Christians call it Saint Mama. Deir Mama is famous for making the traditional Arak liquor and natural silk handicraft.

== History ==
According to a survey by historian Stefan Winter of a 20th-century biographical dictionary of Alawite notables in Syria, itself drawn from locally-preserved religious treatises and poetry, Deir Mama and neighboring Baarin, Deir Shamil) and Wadi al-Uyun were the original areas of Alawite rural concentration in Syria before the religion spread to the mountains around Latakia and Jableh during the Mamluk period (1260–1516).

In 1744, an Ottoman firman alleged that some 3,000 Alawite villagers from Deir Mama, Ayn al-Kurum, Annab and elsewhere in the vicinity had raided the coastal fortress of al-Marqab and over two dozen villages, burning several homes, trespassing the mosque at Marqab and seizing livestock. The governor of Tripoli Eyalet was ordered to capture the perpetrators and return the stolen goods, but instead his deputy rallied the people of Marqab and rampaged through the Alawite country up to the castle of Qal'at al-Mudiq in the Ghab plain.

== Sericulture ==
Before the ongoing Syrian civil war, which began in 2011–2012, Deir Mama was well known in Syria for its sericulture, with most families engaged in different stages of the production process, from raising silkworms, spinning their cocoons to weaving silk fabric for sale to the markets of Damascus. The mulberry trees on which the silkworms and their cocoons were raised and harvested formerly spread across vast tracts of Deir Mama's lands. Shrinking demand before the war had already caused steep declines in the village's silk industry and much of its mulberry groves had been replaced with olive trees. While in 2010 there were 16 villages and 48 families in Syria still engaged in sericulture, that number had dwindled to three families, with that of Mohammed Saud being the last one in Deir Mama. Saud opened a silk museum in his home in 2020.

== Bibliography ==
- Lee, Jess (2010). Syria Handbook. Footprint Travel Guides. ISBN 978-1907263033.
- Montenegro, Silvia (2018). "'Alawi Muslims in Argentina: religious and political identity in the diaspora" (PDF). Cont Islam. 12: 23–38. doi:10.1007/s11562-017-0405-7.
- Winter, Stefan (2016). A History of the 'Alawis: From Medieval Aleppo to the Turkish Republic. Princeton and Oxford: Princeton University Press. ISBN 9780691167787.
