= Assassin's Creed Revelations =

2011 video game

Assassin's Creed: Revelations
- Developer: Ubisoft Montreal (Note: Additional work by Ubisoft Annecy, Ubisoft Bucharest, Massive Entertainment, Ubisoft Quebec and Ubisoft Singapore. Ported to Microsoft Windows by Ubisoft Kyiv and Ubisoft Bucharest.)
- Publisher: Ubisoft
- Director: Alexandre Amancio
- Producer: Martin Schelling
- Designer: Alexandre Breault
- Programmer: Alexandre Begnoche
- Artist: Raphaël Lacoste
- Writer: Darby McDevitt
- Composers: Lorne Balfe; Jesper Kyd
- Series: Assassin's Creed
- Engine: Anvil
- Platforms: PlayStation 3; Xbox 360; Microsoft Windows; PlayStation 4; Xbox One; Nintendo Switch
- Release: November 15, 2011: PlayStation 3, Xbox 360; WW: November 15, 2011 Microsoft Windows; NA: November 29, 2011; AU: December 1, 2011; EU: December 2, 2011 PlayStation 4, Xbox One; WW: November 15, 2016 Nintendo Switch; WW: February 17, 2022
- Genres: Action-adventure, stealth
- Modes: Single-player, multiplayer

Assassin's Creed: Revelations is a 2011 action-adventure game developed by Ubisoft Montreal and published by Ubisoft. It is the fourth major installment of the Assassin's Creed series, and a direct sequel to 2010's Assassin's Creed: Brotherhood, concluding the "Ezio Trilogy". The game was released on PlayStation 3, Xbox 360, and Microsoft Windows in November and December 2011. A remastered version of Revelations, along with Assassin's Creed II and Brotherhood, was released as part of The Ezio Collection compilation for the PlayStation 4 and Xbox One on November 15, 2016, and for the Nintendo Switch on February 17, 2022.

The game's plot is set in a fictional history of real-world events and follows the millennia-old struggle between the Assassins, who fight to preserve peace and free will, and the Templars, who desire peace through control. The framing story is set in the 21st century and features the series protagonist Desmond Miles who, after falling into a coma during the events of Brotherhood, must relive the memories of his ancestors through the Animus in order to awaken and find a way to avert the 2012 apocalypse. The main story spans the years 1511 and 1512 and follows an aged Ezio Auditore da Firenze (the protagonist of the trilogy) as he travels to Constantinople to find five keys needed to unlock a library built by Altaïr Ibn-LaʼAhad (the protagonist of the first game in the series). In Constantinople, Ezio becomes caught in a war of succession for the Ottoman throne and must unravel a conspiracy by the Byzantine Templars, who are attempting to reclaim control of the city and acquire the keys to Altaïr's library themselves.

Revelations features an open world and is played from the third-person perspective, with a primary focus on using Ezio's and Altaïr's combat, climbing and stealth abilities to eliminate targets and explore the environment. Ezio, whom the player controls throughout the majority of the game, can freely explore Constantinople and complete side missions unrelated to the main storyline. Altaïr is playable in a smaller capacity, as he is featured only in a series of flashback missions set in Masyaf from 1189 to 1257. In the modern-day, the player controls Desmond in a series of first-person platforming levels within the Animus. The multiplayer mode returns from Assassin's Creed: Brotherhood, and has been expanded with additional maps, characters, and game modes.

The game was released with multiple editions, some of which featured exclusive limited-time content. Most notably, several editions included an animated short film, titled Assassin's Creed: Embers, which serves as a proper conclusion to Ezio's story, and which was later re-released as a free download on the PlayStation Store. Downloadable content (DLC) released for the game includes new maps and characters for the multiplayer mode, and a story expansion titled The Lost Archive, which adds more platforming levels to the modern-day.

Upon release, Revelations received largely positive reviews, with praise directed at the world design and narrative, although some reviewers noted that the gameplay of the series was getting overly familiar and the newly introduced features felt lacking in comparison to the ones introduced in previous titles. The game was a large commercial success, outperforming the sales of its predecessors. It was followed in October 2012 by Assassin's Creed III, which introduces a new storyline and protagonist in the New World during the 18th century, while also concluding Desmond's story arc.

== Gameplay ==
Assassin's Creed: Revelations is an action-adventure, stealth game set in an open world environment and played from a third-person perspective. The game features three distinct protagonists: Ezio Auditore, Altaïr Ibn-LaʼAhad, and Desmond Miles. When playing as Ezio or Altaïr, the game retains the series' standard gameplay formula, consisting of a mixture of combat, stealth, and exploration. While the base gameplay remains virtually unchanged from the previous title, Assassin's Creed: Brotherhood, Revelations does add several new features; most notably, the "Hookblade," which acts as a replacement for Ezio's second Hidden Blade (which is broken at the beginning of the game). The Hookblade is intended to facilitate traversal and compensate for Ezio's old age, allowing him to climb buildings much faster and reach further ledges. It can also be used to jump over large gaps and access ziplines across the environment. Reportedly, the Hookblade speeds up navigation by around 30 percent. The Hookblade also has applications in combat, allowing for new moves such as grabbing and yanking enemies for a combo attack.

Ezio using the Hookblade to access a zipline and air-assassinate an enemy. The Hookblade is one of the new features introduced in Revelations.

Another new aspect of the game is bomb crafting. Introduced early on in the story, this mechanic allows Ezio to experiment with different shells and ingredients to create bombs with various effects, such as smoke to distract guards or lethal explosions that can take out large groups of enemies. There are around 15 different bomb variations in the game, although only three can be equipped at any given time.

Revelations is primarily set in the city of Constantinople during the rise of the Ottoman Empire. It is similar in size to Rome from Brotherhood, and just like it, it can be renovated by purchasing different stores, such as armories, book shops, and apothecaries. Doing so not only grants Ezio access to that store's services, but also increases the passive income generated by the city, which is deposited in the bank and must be collected regularly. The player can also renovate several of Constantinople's landmarks, like the Galata Tower, Hagia Sophia, and the Topkapı Palace, to increase their overall income. Other locations visited during the story include Masyaf and Cappadocia.

Similarly to Brotherhood's "Borgia tower" system, players can gradually take control of Constantinople from the Templars by destroying their towers in each of the city's districts and killing the Templar captain stationed there. However, this feature has been expanded, as now the Templars will attempt to reclaim their towers if Ezio's notoriety becomes too high and the player has not yet taken over all the Templar dens. When this occurs, the player will have to defend the tower in a "Den Defense" minigame, where they control a group of Assassins from the rooftops and must fight off multiple waves of Templar soldiers and siege equipment.

Another returning feature from Brotherhood is the ability to recruit Assassin initiates and call them for support during missions or send them on assignments to other cities around the Mediterranean Sea, which are controlled by the Templars. By completing contracts, the initiates gain experience and level up, granting them access to better equipment, and also reduce the Templar influence in a particular region. When Templar control over a city is weakened enough, the Assassins can launch an attack to try and take it over. To prevent the Templars from reconquering a city, Ezio can assign up to five Assassins to be permanently stationed there. An Assassin recruit who has reached the highest possible rank can be assigned to serve as the "Den Master" for any of the Assassin-controlled towers in Constantinople. This allows them to level up five additional ranks and also unlocks a unique mission for each district, in which Ezio and the Assassin hunt down a dangerous Templar in that area of the city.

Other side activities include Piri Reis Missions, which teach the player about the different types of bombs that can be crafted; Guild Challenges for any of the three ally factions in the game (Thieves, Mercenaries, and the Romani); and finding rare books for Ezio's love interest, Sofia Sartor. In-game collectibles include treasure chests, Animus data fragments, and Ishak Pasha's Memoir Pages, the last of which unlock a secret mission akin to the Assassin Tombs from Assassin's Creed II and Lairs of Romulus from Brotherhood, in which Ezio must explore the inside of Hagia Sophia to retrieve Pasha's armor set.

Outside of the Ezio sequences, the game also features six Altaïr memories, which are unlocked after Ezio retrieves each "key" for the Masyaf library. In these sequences, Ezio is reliving key memories from Altaïr's life in Masyaf, during which the player controls the latter. Besides Ezio and Altaïr, the player can also play as Desmond in the modern day, whose mind is stuck in the computerized core of the Animus, known as "Animus Island." The island acts as a mini-hub, from where Desmond can access five memory sequences known as "Desmond's Journey," as long as the player has collected enough data fragments or has The Lost Archive DLC installed. These sequences play differently from anything that has come before in the series, as they involve first-person platforming and puzzles, while the story is provided in the form of narration by Desmond, who recounts his life prior to the events of the first Assassin's Creed game.

The console versions of the game support the stereoscopic 3D mode for both 3D-HD and 2D-HD television screens. All Revelations gameplay videos and cinematics have S3D support.

=== Multiplayer ===
Multiplayer gameplay also makes a return in Revelations, and builds upon the basic game modes from Brotherhood with new characters and locations and improved matchmaking and game interface. Before release, Ubisoft stated that although this component is returning, the narrative, which is considered more important to the franchise, is an area of greater focus. As players level up in multiplayer, they move up in their Abstergo Templar rank and gain access to more information about the company.

New multiplayer modes are added to the already existing modes, including "story-oriented quests," as well as a much-requested Capture the Flag mode. Some multiplayer maps are based in the island of Rhodes. Among the new additions is a new multiplayer mode — Deathmatch — which differs from the previous multiplayer gameplay in that there is no compass pointing toward your assigned target, rather, there is a box in the top right of the screen where your current target is displayed, which glows blue when you enter the line of sight of your target. There is also Simple Deathmatch, which also removes the abilities and perks from the players.

The multiplayer function is protected by the Uplay Passport system on PlayStation 3 and Xbox 360, which requires a code for access. Codes are included in all new copies of the game but are tied to a single Uplay account. This means that players who purchased their copy secondhand will need to purchase a new code to access the multiplayer. Uplay players could buy a new Passport code online or activate a free trial.

Players who preordered the game with specific editions received three exclusive multiplayer characters: the Ottoman Jester, the Crusader, and the Ottoman Doctor. Those who played the Assassin's Creed Brotherhood multiplayer received the Courtesan, a character who also appeared in the multiplayer for Brotherhood. More characters and maps were later added via downloadable content.

Ubisoft announced that the multiplayer servers for Revelations, alongside several other of their older titles, would be shut down on September 1, 2022. The date was later delayed to October 1, 2022. This turns all multiplayer-related achievements and trophies on the original console versions unobtainable.

== Synopsis ==
=== Setting and characters ===
Assassin's Creed Revelations features all three of the series' major characters up until this point: Desmond Miles (Nolan North), Altaïr Ibn-La'Ahad (Cas Anvar), and Ezio Auditore da Firenze (Roger Craig Smith). The main part of the story takes Ezio to Constantinople, present-day Istanbul, in 1511 AD, during the rise of the Ottoman Empire. Four of the city's districts are available to explore: Constantine, Bayezid, Imperial, and Galata. Ezio also briefly travels to Cappadocia, part of which is a completely underground city populated solely by Templars, and Masyaf, where the old Assassins' stronghold is located (featured in the first Assassin's Creed game). He discovers that Altaïr has allegedly sealed the power to end the Assassin-Templar war forever within the fortress, and had the keys hidden in Constantinople.

The game also continues the storylines of both Desmond and Altaïr following the previous games in the series. After falling into a coma at the end of Assassin's Creed: Brotherhood, Desmond has become trapped in the Animus 2.0, where he finds a safe mode known as "the Black Room". Helped by the preserved consciousness of Clay Kaczmarek / Subject 16 (Graham Cuthbertson), Abstergo Industries' previous Animus test subject, he must find a "synch nexus", a key memory that links him with Altaïr and Ezio, to reintegrate his splintered subconscious and awaken from his coma. Altaïr's part of the narrative is told in the form of flashbacks experienced by Ezio through the Masyaf keys he finds, which hold Altaïr's memories. It spans the years 1189–1257 AD and depicts several key moments in Altaïr's life, primarily his struggle to lead the Assassins into a new era after becoming their Mentor.

During the game, Ezio meets a variety of historical figures, including Prince Suleiman (Haaz Sleiman), the man who will one day become one of the Ottoman Empire's greatest Sultans; Suleiman's father, Selim I (Mark Ivanir), and uncle, Ahmet (Tamer Hassan); and Byzantine Templars lurking in the shadows of Constantinople, such as Manuel Palaiologos (Vlasta Vrana), an heir to the now-lost Byzantine Empire, and Shahkulu (Alex Ivanovici), leader of the rebellion of the same name directed against the Ottoman Empire. Ezio's love interest, Sofia Sartor (Anna Tuveri), is based on Portrait of a Young Venetian Woman by Albrecht Dürer. Other in-game characters include Yusuf Tazim (Chris Parson), Piri Reis (Alex Ivanovici), Tarik Barleti (JB Blanc), Ishak Pasha, Sultan Bayezid II, Al Mualim (Peter Renaday), and Niccolò and Maffeo Polo.

=== Plot ===
==== Single-player ====
Following the events of Assassin's Creed: Brotherhood, Shaun Hastings stays in Rome to attend Lucy Stillman's funeral, while Rebecca Crane takes the comatose Desmond to his father, William Miles, in New York. To save Desmond's mind, they place him in the Animus's safe mode, the "Black Room". Awakening on Animus Island, a testing program within the Black Room, Desmond meets the consciousness of Clay Kaczmarek, Abstergo's previous Animus test subject, who explains that Desmond must repair his mind by fully reliving his ancestors' memories, at which point the Animus can separate Desmond from his ancestors and awaken him.

Desmond returns to the perspective of Ezio, who, in 1511, travels to the Assassins' former fortress in Masyaf after learning of a library built there by Altaïr. Ezio finds Masyaf occupied by the Templars, who try to execute him, but he escapes and discovers Altaïr has sealed his library using five keys. Ezio travels to Constantinople, where the Templars have already found one key, to search for the rest. While in the city, Ezio meets and befriends Yusuf Tazim, leader of the Ottoman Assassins, and a young student named Suleiman. He also meets Sofia Sartor, an Italian traveler and bookshop owner, and the two fall in love as they work together to find the keys, which were hidden by Niccolò Polo.

Meanwhile, the Ottoman Princes Ahmet and Selim are quarreling over who will inherit the Sultanate. Revealing himself as Selim's son, Suleiman asks Ezio to investigate the Byzantine Templars, who are taking advantage of the feud to further their own goals. Ezio discovers that Manuel Palaiologos, with Templar support, is raising an army to overthrow the Ottomans and re-establish the Byzantine Empire. He travels to the Templars' hideout in Cappadocia, where he assassinates Manuel and recovers the final key. However, Ezio discovers Ahmet to be the true Templar leader, who seeks to open Altaïr's library in the belief it will allow him to further the Templar cause by "erasing the superstitions that keep men divided".

During these events, Ezio uses the keys to witness various moments in Altaïr's life. He learns that Altaïr, after killing his traitorous mentor, Al Mualim, took over and tried to reform the Assassins, but was challenged by a former friend, Abbas Sofian. While Altaïr, his wife Maria, and eldest son Darim were away fighting the Mongol invasion, Abbas staged a coup and seized control of the Assassins after executing Altaïr's youngest son, Sef, and best friend, Malik. Altaïr sought revenge, but Maria tried to stop him, leading to her also being killed. Altaïr was subsequently forced into a self-imposed exile but eventually returned to kill Abbas and reclaim leadership of the Assassins. Years later, Altaïr imprinted his memories on the keys before entrusting them to Niccolò.

Returning to Constantinople, Ezio discovers that Ahmet has killed Yusuf and kidnapped Sofia. After trading the keys to rescue Sofia, Ezio pursues Ahmet with her help, and ultimately recovers the keys. Selim, now the Sultan, arrives and kills Ahmet while sparing Ezio due to Suleiman's endorsement, though he banishes him from Constantinople. After completing this memory, the Animus begins to delete excess data. Clay sacrifices himself to save Desmond from being deleted.

Ezio and Sofia return to Masyaf, where Ezio unlocks Altaïr's library, finding it empty except for Altaïr's skeleton holding a sixth key. Through it, Ezio discovers the library was a vault meant to house Altaïr's Apple of Eden and that Altaïr had sealed himself to protect it. Understanding how much Altaïr had lost because of his obsession with seeking knowledge, Ezio chooses to leave the Apple there, having "seen enough for one life". He then speaks directly to Desmond, knowing he is watching, and acknowledges his own role as a conduit for a message. Hoping that Desmond will find the answers he could not and will make both his and Altaïr's suffering be worth it in the end, Ezio activates the Apple before retiring from the Assassins to start a normal life with Sofia.

The Apple displays a message from Jupiter, a member of the First Civilization, who explains that his race had studied methods to save the Earth from destruction and transmitted all the collected data to a central vault: the Grand Temple. Jupiter tells Desmond that he must find the Temple before an impending solar flare wipes out humanity. Awakening from the coma, Desmond finds Rebecca, Shaun, and William next to him, and tells them that he knows what they must do, just as they arrive at the Grand Temple.

==== Multiplayer ====
The multiplayer aspect has its own plot from the Templar perspective. After impressing Warren Vidic in the first stage of Abstergo's Animus Training Program, the player is selected to participate in the second stage of the program for further training. Upon being promoted to the rank of Master Templar, the player is allowed into the Inner Sanctum of the Templar Order and is implanted with a tracker to ensure their trustworthiness. After reaching level 50, the player is dubbed an active agent and assigned the task of finding and capturing the leader of the Assassin Order: William Miles.

=== The Lost Archive ===
During his time in the Black Room, Desmond involuntarily experiences Clay Kaczmarek's memories, learning more about his life. Clay recalls his father's disregard for his career goals, demanding that Clay should become an engineer to provide for his family, and how he believed that his father's focus on wealth pushed his mother away from the family. Eventually, Clay was approached by William Miles, who invited him to join the Assassins. In 2010, he was tasked with infiltrating Abstergo Industries' Animus Project laboratory in Rome to uncover what Warren Vidic hoped to achieve by exploring the genetic memories of various Assassins. Lucy Stillman, an Assassin herself, had also been placed within the facility to extract Clay once his mission was complete.

Becoming Subject 16 of the Animus Project, Clay was forced to relive his ancestors' memories to the point of being driven insane, but eventually learned that Vidic was searching for the locations of various Pieces of Eden. In particular, Vidic focused on finding an Apple of Eden, which was meant to be launched aboard a satellite to mentally enslave the human race. Clay also secretly witnessed conversations between Lucy and Vidic, and discovered that Lucy had betrayed the Assassins and joined the Templars due to her distrust of William Miles and feeling abandoned by the Brotherhood. To obtain the Apple, Vidic masterminded "Project Siren", which would see Lucy remove Desmond from the Abstergo facility and transport him to a more comfortable environment, where she could use the Assassins' resources to locate the Apple before delivering it to the Templars. When Lucy eventually found out that Clay had learned about this plan, she got rid of the evidence proving he knew the truth and imprisoned him inside the facility, both to protect him and to keep her true allegiances secret.

These memories continue in a loop until Desmond collects all the fragments scattered throughout them, which allow him to access a final memory. In it, Clay emails his father to tell him not to worry about his disappearance, because he has found a greater purpose to serve, foreshadowing his suicide.

== Development ==
Assassin's Creed: Revelations was initially conceived as a Nintendo 3DS game called Assassin's Creed: Lost Legacy about Ezio traveling east to the Assassins' former city of Masyaf, where he would have discovered the origins of the Assassin Order. It was first announced during Nintendo's E3 2010 press conference. It was quietly canceled and its main concept was developed into Assassin's Creed: Revelations.

In November 2010, Ubisoft's CEO Yves Guillemot teased "something Assassin's related" in 2011, despite an earlier statement by Ubisoft Montreal's Jean-Francois Boivin that no Assassin's Creed game would be released in 2011. Geoffroy Sardin of Ubisoft later confirmed that there would be a "big" Assassin's Creed game in 2011. Guillemot also explained that ultimate goal for Ubisoft is to release new games in the franchise annually along with Ubisoft's most popular other franchises. In February 2011, Ubisoft CEO Yves Guillemot confirmed that the next Assassin's Creed game would be released during its next fiscal year, which starts on April 1, 2011, and ends on March 31, 2012.

On April 29, 2011, the game's name was released on the official Assassin's Creed Facebook page, with a link which led to a flash file. The teaser clip included the words, "Altaïr Ibn La-Ahad, Son of no one" in Arabic which hinted that Altaïr, the main protagonist of the first game, may once again be the main protagonist of the game. A third teaser clip for the game showed the city of Constantinople, which hinted at it being the setting for the game. In the E3 rumor section of its April 2011 issue, Xbox World 360 said Assassin's Creed: Revelations was not Assassin's Creed III, but suggested that game was also secretly in the works. Revelations was likely to be "another slimline Brotherhood-style offering", Xbox World 360 stated. On May 5, Game Informer released details of the game, and the game was officially announced by Ubisoft at E3 2011.

The game was developed primarily by Ubisoft Montreal in Canada. Production was aided in part by five other Ubisoft developers: Annecy, Massive, Quebec, Singapore, and Bucharest. Lead writer Darby McDevitt said that Revelations would not answer all the burning questions clouding the series, stating "Well, we won't answer everything because Desmond's story continues. But fans will definitely know most of the important details of Ezio and Altair's lives, and how they fit into the grand scheme." McDevitt also stated that 85 percent of Assassin's Creed's overarching plot was already "mapped out". McDevitt claimed original Creed protagonist Altaïr had his story arc written for two years, and that Ezio's ultimate fate was planned during the development of Brotherhood.

The voice of Desmond Miles, Nolan North, urged Ubisoft to adopt motion capture methods similar to Naughty Dog's Uncharted. Speaking in an interview, North admitted there was a "disconnect" in the Ubisoft game's current setup, which had voice actors provide voice facial animation separately from body motion capture, which was recorded by different actors. "I wish it wasn't done separately," North said. "Don't get me wrong, the mo-cap actors do a great job, but there will always be somewhat of a disconnect when it's done this way. After my experiences on the Uncharted franchise, where the actors do both performance and voice, I can honestly say there is absolutely a difference."

The PC version of Assassin's Creed: Revelations does not force players to always be online to work like its predecessors, despite Ubisoft's recent claims that its policy was a success, insisting it had seen "a clear reduction in piracy of our titles which required a persistent online connection". Even then, the always-online DRM was permanently removed from all single-player games. It does, however, require a one-time-only online activation the very first time the player plays the game, which will permanently bind the activation code to the player's account, and thus, it does not need to be activated again on the same account if the game is reinstalled for some reason. This also applies to reinstalling on another computer. Following that, the player can permanently play the game in offline mode.

Remastered versions of Assassin's Creed II, Brotherhood and Revelations were released as part of The Ezio Collection compilation for the PlayStation 4 and Xbox One on November 15, 2016, and for the Nintendo Switch on February 17, 2022. The remastered version includes support for UHD resolution on the PS4 Pro.

== Marketing and release ==
Ubisoft announced a PlayStation Network timed exclusive multiplayer beta for Assassin's Creed Revelations on August 10, 2011. The beta began on September 3, 2011, and finished on September 17, 2011, exclusively for PlayStation Plus and Uplay members on PlayStation 3. On September 8, the multiplayer beta opened to everyone with a PSN account. The beta offered access to nine characters (The Sentinel, The Vanguard, The Guardian, The Vizier, The Thespian, The Deacon, The Bombardier, The Trickster, The Champion – all boasting different abilities), three maps (Knight's Hospital, Antioch, Galata) and four playable modes (the previously seen Wanted and Manhunt options joined by new Deathmatch and Artifact Assault variants).

Media Molecule announced on November 15, 2011, that a new Ezio costume for Sackboy would be made available in LittleBigPlanet 2 to promote the launch of Assassin's Creed: Revelations. Those who pre-ordered through Best Buy got an exclusive multiplayer character. All day one copies of Revelations for the PlayStation 3 had the first Assassin's Creed bundled as part of the disc, which launched in 2007. Ubisoft called the announcement a "special partnership" between itself and Sony Computer Entertainment America, and said that the deal only applied in Europe. Additionally, Ubisoft released an Assassin's Creed: Revelations Avatar collection Xbox 360, which includes a Codex prop, Desmond's black hoodie, and a pet eagle. Also, the following outfits will be available: Ezio, Bombardier, Guardian, Sentinel, and Vanguard (female only).

=== Retail editions ===
| Features | Standard (consoles & PC) | Animus Edition (consoles & PC) | Collector's Edition (consoles & PC) | Special Edition (consoles & PC) | Signature Edition (consoles & PC) | Gold Edition (PC Download) | Ultimate Bundle (consoles & PC) | Ottoman Edition (consoles & PC) |
|---|---|---|---|---|---|---|---|---|
| Game disc | Yes | Yes | Yes | Yes | Yes | No, (Download) | Yes | Yes |
| Exclusive packaging | No | Yes (Animus box packaging) | Yes (Special Collector's Edition packaging) | Yes (standard box with exclusive artwork) | Yes (Black and white variant of standard box art) | No | Yes (Black, fold-out cardboard box) | Yes |
| In-depth encyclopedia | No | Yes | No | No | No | No | No | No |
| 50-page art book | No | No | Yes | No | No | No | No | No |
| The original game's soundtrack | No | Yes | Yes | Yes | Yes | No | Yes | No |
| Assassin's Creed Embers Movie DVD | No | Yes | Yes | No | Yes | No | Yes | No |
| Exclusive single-player mission | No | Yes (Vlad the Impaler Prison) | Yes (Vlad the Impaler Prison) | No | Yes (Vlad the Impaler Prison) | Yes (Vlad the Impaler Prison) | Yes (Vlad the Impaler Prison) | Yes (Vlad the Impaler Prison) |
| The Lost Archive DLC | No | No | No | No | No | Yes | No | Yes |
| Exclusive multiplayer character | No | Yes (The Crusader and Ottoman Jester) | Yes (The Crusader and Ottoman Jester) | Yes (The Crusader and Ottoman Doctor) | Yes (Ottoman Jester) | Yes (The Crusader, Ottoman Jester and Ottoman Doctor) | Yes (Ottoman Jester) | Yes (The Crusader, Ottoman Jester and Ottoman Doctor) |
| Exclusive armor for Ezio | No | Yes (Armor of Brutus) | Yes (Turkish Armor and Armor of Brutus) | Yes (Turkish Armor) | No | Yes (Turkish Armor and Armor of Brutus) | No | Yes (Turkish Armor and Armor of Brutus) |
| Altaïr's Robes | No | Yes (as a pre-order bonus from EB Games Australia) | Yes (as a pre-order bonus from Play UK) | No | No | Yes | No | Yes |
| Capacity upgrades | No | Yes (for hidden gun bullets, bombs & crossbow arrows) | Yes (for hidden gun bullets, bombs & crossbow arrows) | No | Yes (for hidden gun bullets, bombs & crossbow arrows) | Yes (for hidden gun bullets, bombs & crossbow arrows) | Yes (for hidden gun bullets, bombs & crossbow arrows) | Yes (for hidden gun bullets, bombs & crossbow arrows) |
| Leonardo da Vinci's flying machine 6"–7" scale replica | No | No | No | No | No | No | Yes | No |
| Ezio 7-inch action figure | No | No | No | No | No | No | Yes | No |

There are several different limited editions of Assassin's Creed Revelations. The Animus, Collector's and Special editions were available on all platforms and only in Europe, Australia and New Zealand, while the Signature Edition was only available in North America through GameStop for all platforms. Those who pre-ordered Assassin's Creed: Revelations through GameStop automatically upgraded to the Signature Edition of the game at no extra cost. The Signature Edition features exclusive packaging, a bonus single-player mission (Vlad the Impaler Prison), an exclusive multiplayer character (Ottoman Jester), weapons capacity upgrades, an animated short film (Assassin's Creed Embers Movie) and the original game's soundtrack.

The "PS3-Only edition" includes the standard game contents plus a complete version of the Assassin's Creed original game included in the game disc. This edition is only available to those who bought the game when it first released or pre-ordered it. The Animus Edition features an Animus box, an in-depth encyclopedia, an animated short film (Assassin's Creed Embers Movie) and the original game's soundtrack. In-game content included is an exclusive mission (Vlad the Impaler Prison), an armor from Assassin's Creed: Brotherhood (Armor of Brutus) in single-player, weapons capacity upgrades, and two additional multiplayer characters (The Crusader and Ottoman Jester).

The Gold Edition is digitally exclusive to the PC. It is available on Uplay and Steam and it contains all the downloadable and redeemable content available on Uplay.

== Downloadable content ==
=== Uplay content ===
Ubisoft's Uplay system enables further in-game enhancements which can be redeemed by points that are given when playing the game. The available awards are a Revelations theme or wallpaper for PC and PlayStation 3, Solo Pack, Mediterranean Exclusive Missions, and Multiplayer Pack which unlocks the Knight character.

=== Ancestors Character Pack ===
On the day of the game's launch, Ubisoft announced that they were working on various downloadable content (DLC) for the game. The first one announced was a character pack, which was released December 13, 2011. It adds four new characters to the multiplayer mode: the Privateer, Corsair, Brigand, and Gladiator.

=== Mediterranean Traveler Map Pack ===
The second DLC pack announced was the Mediterranean Traveler Map Pack, which was released on January 24, 2012. It adds six new multiplayer maps, three of which return from Assassin's Creed: Brotherhood.

=== The Lost Archive ===
The final DLC pack for the game, titled The Lost Archive, was released on February 28, 2012. It adds a new campaign in the style of the "Desmond's Journey" sequences from the base game, as well as most of the exclusive content from the different limited editions of Revelations. The DLC pack is available for purchase separately and bundled with the Ottoman and Gold Editions.

== Reception ==
Reception

Aggregate score
| Aggregator | Score |
|---|---|
| Metacritic | (PS3) 80/100 (X360) 80/100 (PC) 80/100 |

Review scores
| Publication | Score |
|---|---|
| 1Up.com | B+ |
| Destructoid | 7.5/10 |
| Edge | 7/10 |
| Eurogamer | 7/10 |
| Game Informer | 8.75/10 |
| GamePro | 7/10 |
| GameSpot | 8.0/10 |
| GamesRadar+ | 8/10 |
| GameTrailers | 8.8/10 |
| IGN | 8.5/10 |
| Joystiq | 4/5 |
| PlayStation Official Magazine – UK | 9/10 |
| Official Xbox Magazine (US) | 8.5/10 |
| VideoGamer.com | 7/10 |

Assassin's Creed: Revelations received generally positive reviews from critics upon release. Aggregating review websites GameRankings and Metacritic gave the PlayStation 3 version 80.05% and 80/100, the Xbox 360 version 79.37% and 80/100, and the PC version 74.67% and 80/100 respectively. IGN gave the game a rating of 8.5 out of 10, stating "This is the best Assassin's Creed yet, even if that victory is claimed by an inch and not a mile. If you've been following the lives of Altair and Ezio this long, you owe it to yourself to see their last adventure." 1UP gave the game a rating of B+, stating "While Revelations lacks that one supreme improvement or standout mechanic that defined AC2 and Brotherhood each, it's still a damn fine sendoff for Altair and Ezio."

Edge gave the game a rating of 7 out of 10, saying that "unlike the elegant lead, who's grey-haired but unbowed by the end of the adventure, Assassin's Creed has been quietly compromised by age." Eurogamer also gave the game a rating of 7 out of 10, writing "where Brotherhood enhanced the thrill of being Ezio Auditore, Revelations distracts from it. Ezio may look old, but it's the series itself that really shows its age."

VideoGamer gave the game a rating of 7 out of 10, stating "So, for the first time, a new Assassin's Creed game is worse than its predecessor, the first time the short development period has had a noticeable impact on the game's quality. It's a game of nearly and might-have-been: summed up by the hook blade, a supposedly key new feature which in practice merely extends Ezio's reach slightly, and allows him to glide down the occasional zipline." GamePro also gave the game a rating of 7 out of 10, saying that "at its core, this is the Assassin's Creed we've grown to love in recent years, and it still serves as a pretty good time sink – plus, it's a necessary bridge to next year's already-announced follow-up. But obligation shouldn't be the primary reason to play something, and sadly, that's too often the case in this humdrum campaign."

Game Informer gave the game a rating of 8.75 out of 10, writing "a number of new features have been attempted to make Revelations feel new and different from its predecessors. In that quest for broader variety and unique identity from the earlier games, Revelations makes some missteps that are hard to ignore. However, the game offers more of what has been great about the franchise, and that should be enough to bring most fans to the table, even if it is a poor starting point for new players." GameTrailers also gave the game a rating of 8.8 out of 10, saying that "the engine is a bit long in the tooth and some of the content isn't entirely worth exploring, but if you're looking for an unforgettable top-shelf action/adventure, heed the creed."

Official Xbox Magazine gave the game a rating of 8.5 out of 10, stating "What's available here remains as ridiculously appealing as ever. It's still a thrill unique to the series to be perched six stories high, looking out across miles of meticulously rendered game world — even if that dazzling, danger-filled world has grown overly familiar, having traded what was once revolution for iterative evolution." UK Official PlayStation Magazine gave the game a rating of 9 out of 10, stating "As a conclusion for Ezio's chapter, Revelations proves an utterly brilliant swansong."

During the 15th Annual Interactive Achievement Awards, the Academy of Interactive Arts & Sciences nominated Revelations for "Outstanding Achievement in Animation".

=== Sales ===
Ubisoft CEO Yves Guillemot announced during an earnings call on November 8, 2011, that pre-orders for Assassin's Creed: Revelations were "significantly higher" than figures for Assassin's Creed: Brotherhood, yet the firm was still expecting a "double-digit decline" in sales for Revelations compared to the other title. According to NPD Group, Revelations was the fourth-best selling game in the U.S. in November 2011. Ubisoft announced sales of Revelations was up 10 percent year-on-year on the 2010s Brotherhood. That put Revelations' first month total at around 1.26 million. Revelations debuted at second place in the UK video game sales chart in its first week. Its week one numbers were better than those of its predecessor Brotherhood by four percent in unit terms and eight percent in revenue, making it the best-performing title both in the series and in Ubisoft's history to date. 61 percent of the game's sales occurred in the first 24 hours. As of February 15, 2012, the game has shipped 7 million copies worldwide.
