= Maarin =

Maarin معرين Ma'arrin
- Village
- Location in Syria
- Coordinates: 35°9′25″N 36°26′41″E
- Country: Syria
- Governorate: Hama
- District: Masyaf
- Subdistrict: Jubb Ramlah

Population (2004)
  - Total: 1,830
- Time zone: UTC+3 (AST)

Maarin (Arabic: معرين, also spelled Ma'arrin) is a village in northwestern Syria, administratively part of the Hama Governorate, located west of Hama. Nearby localities include Mahrusah to the west, Jubb Ramlah to the north, Hanjur and Asilah to the northeast, Umm al-Tiyur to the east, Deir al-Salib to the south and Masyaf to the southwest. According to the Central Bureau of Statistics (CBS), Maarin had a population of 1,830 in the 2004 census.
