= Al-Laqbah =

Al-Laqbah اللقبة Al-Laqbeh
- Village
- Location in Syria
- Coordinates: 35°9′46″N 36°19′26″E
- Country: Syria
- Governorate: Hama
- District: Masyaf
- Subdistrict: Masyaf

Population (2004)
  - Total: 1,908
- Time zone: UTC+3 (AST)

Al-Laqbah (Arabic: اللقبة, also spelled al-Laqbeh or Laqbee) is a town in northwestern Syria, administratively part of the Hama Governorate, located west of Hama. It is situated along the edge of the Orontes River valley, on the main road between Masyaf and northern Syria. Nearby localities include Deir Mama to the south, Jubb Ramlah and Hanjur to the northeast, Deir Shamil to the north and al-Annazah to the west. According to the Syria Central Bureau of Statistics, al-Laqbah had a population of 1,908 in the 2004 census. Its inhabitants are predominantly Alawites.

Al-Laqbah has been identified as the Bronze Age village of "Rugaba" listed by Thutmose III. Al-Laqbah is the site of a former Crusader fort known then as "Laqoba," originally under the authority of the Principality of Antioch. It was ceded by Bohemond III of Antioch to the Knights Hospitallers in 1168.

In the late 1970s a water project was developed in al-Laqbah which serves as the source of water for ten villages in the Tartus Governorate, six in Latakia Governorate and five in the Hama Governorate. Al-Laqbah is the birthplace of Muhammad Nasif Khairbek, the Deputy Vice President for Security Affairs in the Syrian government. Other members of the Nasif family of Laqbah have senior positions in the various security branches of the country.

== Bibliography ==
- Ball, Warwick (1994). Syria: A Historical and Architectural Guide. Scorpion. ISBN 9780905906966.
- Bosworth, Clifford Edmund (1989). The Encyclopaedia of Islam: Fascicules 111-112 : Masrah Mawlid, Parts 111-112. BRILL. ISBN 9004092390.
- Boulanger, Robert (1966). The Middle East, Lebanon, Syria, Jordan, Iraq, Iran. Hachette.
- Edel, Elmar (1979). Festschrift Elmar Edel. M. Gorg.
