= Al-Kahf Castle =

Castle in Syria

Al-Kahf Castle قلعة الكهف
- Al-Ansariyah mountains, Syria
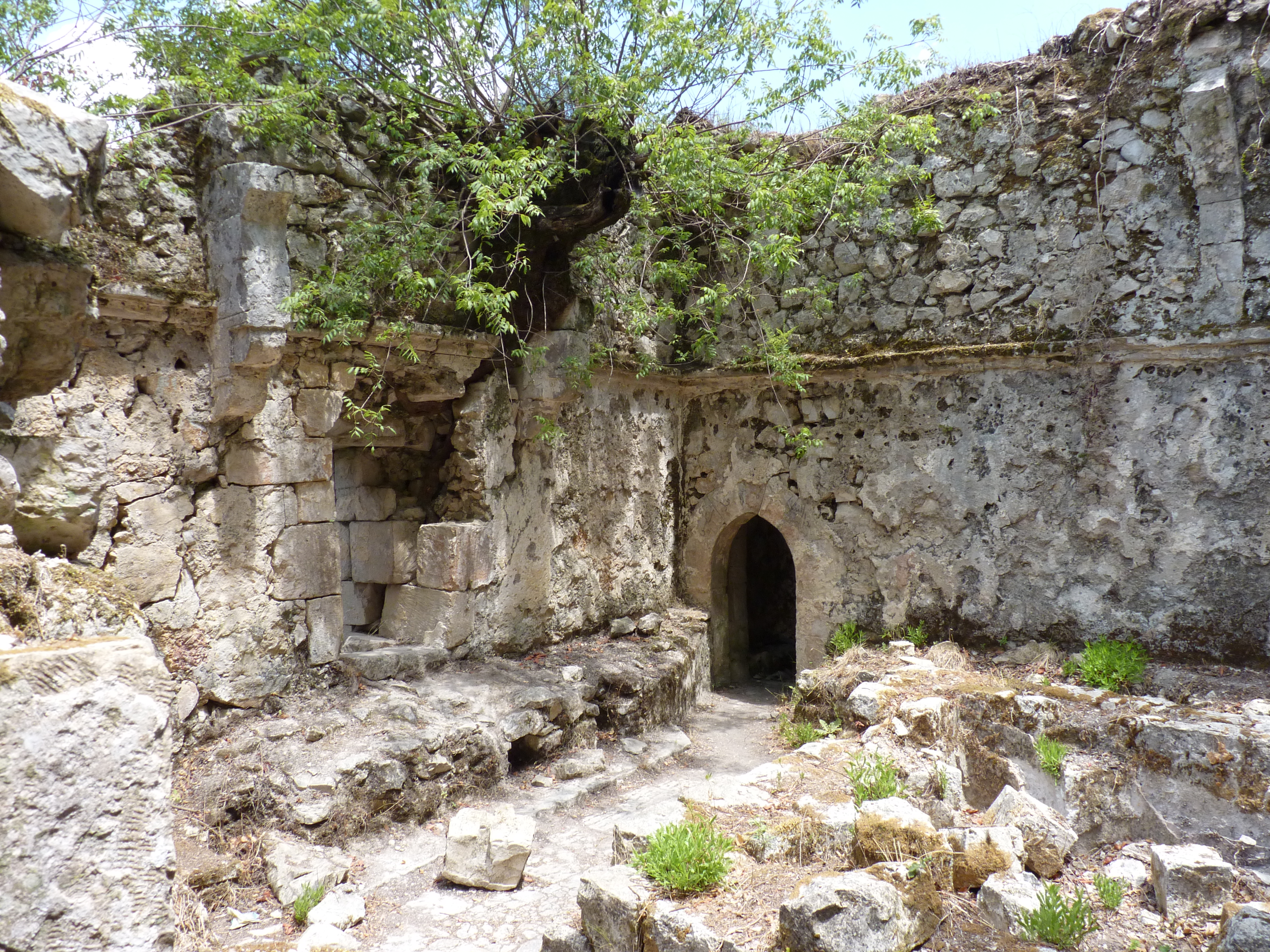

Site information
- Type: Castle
- Owner: Directorate General of Antiquities and Museums (DGAM)
- Controlled by: Saif al-Mulk ibn Amrun (1120–1138); Nizaris (Assassins) (1138–1273); Mamluk Sultanate (1273–1516); Ottoman Empire (1516–1918)
- Open to the public: Yes
- Condition: Partially ruined

Location
- Location within Syria
- Coordinates: 35.0407°N 36.0830°E

Site history
- Built: 1120
- Built by: Saif al-Mulk ibn Amrun
- In use: Until 19th century
- Materials: Limestone
- Demolished: 1816

Al-Kahf Castle or the Castle of the Cave (Arabic: قلعة الكهف, romanized: Qalʻat al-Kahf) is a medieval Nizari Isma'ili castle located around 30 kilometres (19 mi) southeast of Margat, in the al-Ansariyah mountains in northwest Syria.

== History ==
The castle was built around 1120 by Saif al-Mulk ibn Amrun, and was sold to the Isma'ilis 1138 by his son Musa. It served as the base of the Chief Da'i of Syria Abu Muhammad. Rashid ad-Din Sinan, the Arab leader of the Isma'ili sect in Syria, used this castle initially as his base and hermitage. Sinan eventually died and was buried there in 1193. In 1197 the Regent of Jerusalem, Henry II, Count of Champagne, visited the castle to secure an alliance with Sinan's successor. The castle was the last Isma'ili stronghold in Syria to surrender to the Mamluks. Sultan Baibars finally captured it in 1273, and it remained in use until Ottoman times, when it served at times as a prison for important personages. The castle was finally destroyed in 1816 by Mustafa Agha Barbar, the Ottoman governor of Tripoli.

== Overview ==
The castle sits on a ridge between two gorges. The only entrance to the castle runs along a narrow path halfway down the steep northern slope. The general direction of the castle is east–west, running along the spur of rock on which it was built. The castle is divided into three, or possibly four, main sections. At the west end lies a 170 metres (560 ft) long flat section. The section is clear of any buildings, except the outer walls and a bastion at the end. From the outer bailey the ground rises up towards the central citadel and fortifications. These buildings probably contained living quarters, storerooms and the water storage area with seven cisterns.

== See also ==
- List of castles in Syria

== Sources ==
- Darke, Diana (2006), Syria, Bradt Travel Guides, ISBN 978-1-84162-162-3
- Mannheim, Ivan (2001), Syria & Lebanon handbook: the travel guide, Footprint Travel Guides, ISBN 978-1-900949-90-3
- Daftary, Farhad (2001), Mediaeval Isma'ili History and Thought, Cambridge University Press, ISBN 978-0-521-00310-0
- Willey, Peter (2005), Eagle's nest: Ismaili castles in Iran and Syria, I.B.Tauris, ISBN 978-1-85043-464-1
- Setton, Kenneth M.; Baldwin, Marshall W. (2006), A History of the Crusades, Volume I: The First Hundred Years, Univ of Wisconsin Press, ISBN 978-0-299-04834-1
