= Masyaf Castle =

Castle in Syria

Coordinates: 35.06624°N 36.34329°E

- قلعة مصياف
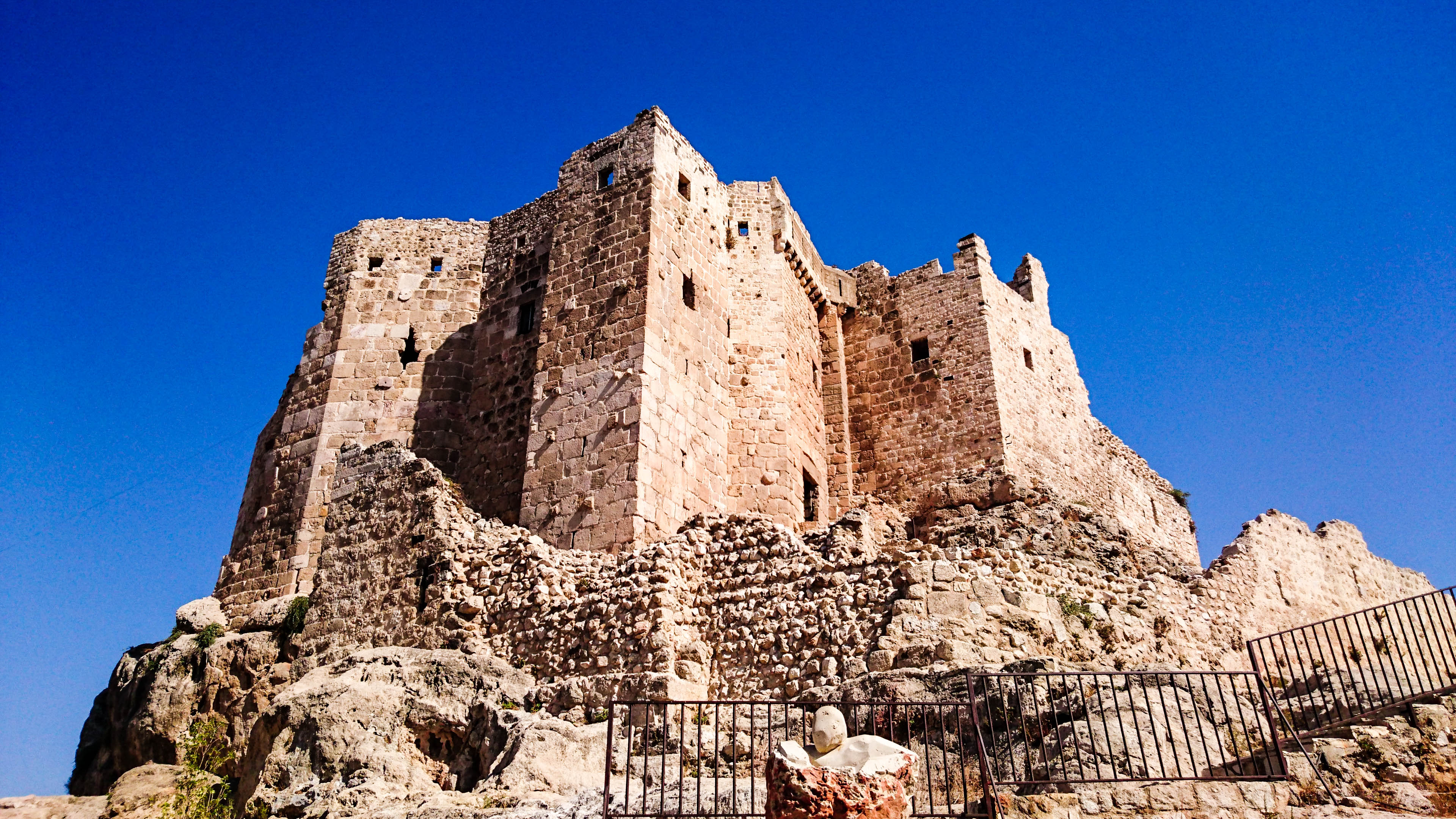
- The fortress of Masyaf

General information
- Type: Castle
- Location: Masyaf, Syria

Masyaf Castle (Arabic: قلعة مصياف) is a medieval structure in the town of Masyaf in Hama Governorate, Syria, situated in the Orontes Valley, approximately 40 kilometres to the west of Hama. It served to protect the approach to other Ismaili castles in the Syrian Coastal Mountain Range (Jabal Ansariya) at a site controlling the trade routes to cities further inland such as Banyas. The castle itself stands on a platform about 20 metres above the surrounding plain. It became famous as the stronghold from which Rashid ad-Din Sinan, known as the Old Man of the Mountain, ruled from 1166 to 1193. He was a leader of the Syrian branch of the Shia Nizari Isma'ili sect, also known as the Assassins, and a figure in the history of the Crusades.

== History ==
Evidence suggests that the lower layers and foundations of the castle are of Byzantine origin. Later levels were added by the Isma'ilis, Mamluks, and Ottomans, with most of the current remains dating back to Rashid and the Nizari construction phase of the 12th century.

The castle was captured by the Assassins in 1141 from Sanqur, who had held it on behalf of the Banu Munqidh of Shaizar, and was later refortified by Rashid al-Din Sinan. Masyaf and the surrounding town functioned as the capital of a Nizari Ismaili emirate from the middle of the 12th century until the end of the 13th century. Saladin besieged it in May 1176, but the siege did not last long and it concluded with a truce. Current research indicates it was held by the Nizari Isma'ilis at that time.

In 1260, Masyaf and three other Nizari fortresses were surrendered to the Mongols. Later that year in September, the Nizaris allied with the victorious Mamluks to drive the Mongols out from Syria, reclaiming four of their castles, including Masyaf. After a decade, in February 1270, Mamluk sultan Baibars took hold of the castle.

In 1808, the Nusayris (Alawites) murdered the Ismaili emir of Masyaf and seized the castle, but the Ismailis managed to recover it with the help of the Ottoman authorities. During the 1830s, the troops of the Egyptian governor, Ibrahim Pasha, caused serious damage to the castle during his suppression of the Syrian revolt against his rule.

Restoration funded by the Aga Khan Trust for Culture Historic Cities Support Programme began in 2000.

== See also ==
- List of castles in Syria
- Alamut Castle
- Atashgah Castle
- Lambsar Castle
- Areimeh Castle
