= Hayalin, Masyaf =

Hayalin حيالين Hayalin Masyaf
- Village
- Location in Syria
- Coordinates: 35°6′2″N 36°19′9″E
- Country: Syria
- Governorate: Hama
- District: Masyaf
- Subdistrict: Masyaf

Population (2004)
  - Total: 1,709
- Time zone: UTC+3 (AST)
- City Qrya Pcode: C3340

Hayalin (Arabic: حيالين) is a Syrian village located in the Masyaf Subdistrict in Masyaf District, located west of Hama. According to the Syria Central Bureau of Statistics (CBS), Hayalinhad a population of 1,709 in the 2004 census.
