= Biqraqa =

Biqraqa بقراقة
- Village
- Location in Syria
- Coordinates: 35°6′8″N 36°21′55″E
- Country: Syria
- Governorate: Hama
- District: Masyaf
- Subdistrict: Masyaf

Population (2004)
  - Total: 798
- Time zone: UTC+3 (AST)
- City Qrya Pcode: C3357

Biqraqa (Arabic: بقراقة) is a Syrian village located in the Masyaf Subdistrict in Masyaf District, located west of Hama. According to the Syria Central Bureau of Statistics (CBS), Biqraqa had a population of 798 in the 2004 census.
