= Al-Shiha =

Al-Shiha الشيحة
- Village
- Location in Syria
- Coordinates: 35°4′13″N 36°15′49″E
- Country: Syria
- Governorate: Hama
- District: Masyaf
- Subdistrict: Masyaf

Population (2004)
  - Total: 1,101
- Time zone: UTC+3 (AST)
- City Qrya Pcode: C3355

Al-Shiha (Arabic: الشيحة) is a Syrian village located in the Masyaf Subdistrict in Masyaf District, located west of Hama. According to the Syria Central Bureau of Statistics (CBS), al-Shiha had a population of 1,101 in the 2004 census.
