= Al-Hurayf =

Al-Hurayf الحريف
- Village
- Location in Syria
- Coordinates: 35°5′54″N 36°20′11″E
- Country: Syria
- Governorate: Hama
- District: Masyaf
- Subdistrict: Masyaf

Population (2004)
  - Total: 1,789
- Time zone: UTC+3 (AST)
- City Qrya Pcode: C3337

Al-Hurayf (Arabic: الحريف) is a Syrian village located in the Masyaf Subdistrict in Masyaf District, located west of Hama. According to the Syria Central Bureau of Statistics (CBS), Hurayf had a population of 1,789 in the 2004 census.
