= Rabu =

Rabu' ربعو Rabho
- Village
- Location in Syria
- Coordinates: 35°4′33″N 36°23′53″E
- Country: Syria
- Governorate: Hama
- District: Masyaf
- Subdistrict: Masyaf

Population (2004)
  - Total: 2,288
- Time zone: UTC+3 (AST)
- City Qrya Pcode: C3343

Rabu′ (Arabic: ربعو, also spelled Rabho) is a Syrian village located in the Masyaf Subdistrict in Masyaf District, located west of Hama. According to the Syria Central Bureau of Statistics (CBS), Rabu′ had a population of 2,288 in the 2004 census.

Rabu' is the site of the ancient Assyrian fortress town of Aribna, part of Lubama. It was where the Assyrian emperor Ashurnasirpal I lodged when the Lukuti area was ravaged.

The tomb of a holy man who was widely venerated in the Masyaf area is located in Rabu'. According to local folklore, "only a man with a clear conscience" could pass through its entrance.

== Bibliography ==
- Boulanger, Robert (1966). The Middle East, Lebanon, Syria, Jordan, Iraq, Iran. Hachette.
