= Hanjur =

Hanjur حنجور
- Village
- Location in Syria
- Coordinates: 35°11′N 36°28′E
- Country: Syria
- Governorate: Hama
- District: Masyaf District
- Subdistrict: Jubb Ramlah Subdistrict

Population (2004)
  - Total: 2,904
- Time zone: UTC+3 (AST)
- City Qrya Pcode: C3380

Hanjur (Arabic: حنجور) is a Syrian village located in Jubb Ramlah Subdistrict in Masyaf District, Hama. According to the Syria Central Bureau of Statistics (CBS), Hanjur had a population of 2,904 in the 2004 census.
