= Rashid ad-Din Sinan =

Leader of the Nizari Ismaili state from 1162 to 1193

Dāʿī Rashid ad-Din Sinan
- راشد الدين سنان
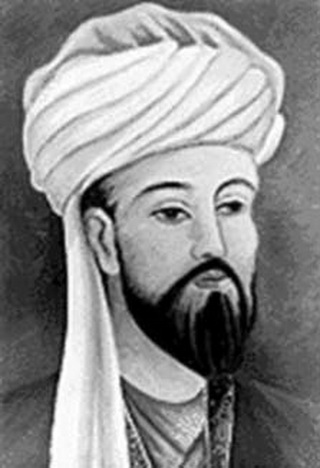
- Grabado de Rashid ad-Din Sinan

Lord of Al-Kahf and Masyaf
- In office 1162–1193
- Preceded by: Abu Muhammad
- Succeeded by: Abu Mansur ibn Muhammad or Nasr al-'Ajami

Personal life
- Born: Abu al-Hasan Sinan ibn Sulayman ibn Muhammad; 1131 or 1135 Basra, Seljuk Empire (now Iraq)
- Died: 1193 (age 58 or 61) Al-Kahf Castle, Nizari Ismaili state (now Syria)
- Resting place: Salamiyah, Syria
- Education: Madrasa of Hasan ibn Muhammad ibn Ali, Alamut
- Known for: Conflict with Saladin and the Crusader states
- Other name: “Shaykh al Jabal ” (Man of the Mountain)

Religious life
- Religion: Shia Islam
- Order: Assassins
- Sect: Nizari Isma'ilism

Rashid al-Din Sinan (Arabic: راشد الدين سنان Rāshid ad-Dīn Sinān; 1131/1135 – 1193), also known as the Old Man of the Mountain (Arabic: شيخ الجبل Sheikh al-Jabal; Latin: Vetulus de Montanis), was an Arab Muslim missionary (dāʿī) who served as the leader of the Nizari Ismaili state and the Order of Assassins from 1162 until his death in 1193. An adherent of Nizari Ismailism, a branch of Shia Islam, he was a prominent figure during the Crusades.

== Biography ==
=== Early life and education ===
Rashid ad-Din Sinan was born between the years 1131 and 1135 in Basra, southern Iraq, to a prosperous family. According to his autobiography, of which only fragments survive, Rashid came to Alamut, the fortress headquarters of the Assassins, as a youth after an argument with his brothers, and received the typical Assassin training. In 1162, the sect's leader Ḥassan ʿAlā Dhikrihi's Salām sent him to Syria, where he proclaimed Qiyama (repeating the ceremony of Hassan II at Alamut), which in Nizari terminology meant the time of the Qa'im and the removal of Islamic law. Based at the Nizari strongholds al-Kahf and later Masyaf, he controlled the northern Syrian districts of Jabal as-Summaq, Maarrat Misrin and Sarmin.

Rashid enjoyed considerable independence from the Nizari centre in Alamut and some writings attribute him with a semi-divine status usually given to the Nizari Ismaili Imam.

=== Assassin activity ===
His chief enemy, the Sultan Saladin (1137/1138–1193), ruled over Egypt and Syria from 1174 to 1193. Saladin managed twice to elude assassination attempts ordered by Rashid and as he was marching against Aleppo, Saladin devastated the Nizari possessions. In 1176, Saladin laid siege to Masyaf but he lifted the siege after two notable events that reputedly transpired between him and the Old Man of the Mountain.

During the siege, Saladin had his guards supplied with link lights and had chalk and cinders strewed around his tent outside Masyaf to detect any footsteps by the Assassins. One night Saladin's guards noticed a spark glowing down the hill of Masyaf and then vanishing among the Ayyubid tents. Saladin awoke to find a figure leaving the tent. He saw that the lamps were displaced and beside his bed laid hot scones of the shape peculiar to the Assassins with a note at the top pinned by a poisoned dagger. The note threatened that he would be killed if he did not withdraw from his siege. Saladin gave a loud cry, exclaiming that Sinan himself was the figure that had left the tent. Saladin then told his guards to come to an agreement with Sinan. Realizing he was unable to subdue the Assassins, he sought to align himself with them, consequently depriving the Crusaders of aligning themselves against him.

Sinan's last notable act occurred in 1191, when he ordered the successful assassination of the newly elected King of Jerusalem Conrad of Montferrat. Whether this happened in coordination with King Richard I of England, with Saladin, or with neither, remains unknown.

In 1193, Sinan wrote a letter to Leopold V, Duke of Austria at the request of Richard I, taking credit for the assassination order and subsequent death of Conrad of Monferrat, of which Richard was being accused. However, this letter is believed by modern historians to be a forgery written after Sinan's death.

He died in 1193 in al-Kahf Castle in Masyaf and was buried in Salamiyah. He was succeeded by the Persian da'i Abu Mansur ibn Muhammad or Nasr al-'Ajami appointed from Alamut, which regained a closer supervision over the Syrian branch of the Assassin Order.

== In popular culture ==
A fictionalized version of Rashid ad-Din Sinan (referred to exclusively as "Al Mualim", meaning The Mentor) appears in Ubisoft's historical video game series Assassin's Creed, voiced by Peter Renaday. His most prominent role is in the original Assassin's Creed game, which depicts him as the Mentor of the Assassin Order in the late 12th century, leading the organization against their sworn rivals, the Knights Templar, during the Third Crusade. Al Mualim is responsible for raising and training the game's protagonist, Altaïr Ibn-LaʼAhad, and sends him on a mission to hunt nine individuals across the Holy Land to redeem himself after a catastrophic failure. However, Al Mualim is gradually revealed as the game's true villain, having manipulated Altaïr and the other Assassins to help him increase his own power and secure an artifact known as the Apple of Eden, with which he intends to end the Crusade and all human conflict at the expense of free will. In the final confrontation of the game, Altaïr overcomes the Apple's powers and kills Al Mualim, succeeding him as Mentor.

Rashid ad-Din Sinan is also portrayed by Turkish actor Barış Bağcı in the Turkish historical TV drama, Kudüs Fatihi Selahaddin Eyyubi (Saladin: Conqueror of Jerusalem).

== Bibliography ==
- Daftary, Farhad (2014). "RĀŠED-AL-DIN SENĀN". Encyclopaedia Iranica.
- Lane-Poole, Stanley (1906). Saladin and the Fall of the Kingdom of Jerusalem.
- Halm, Heinz, Die Schia, Darmstadt 1988, pp. 228f.
- Runciman, Steven: A history of the Crusades Volume 2: The kingdom of Jerusalem and the Frankish East pp. 410
- Franzius, Enno (1969). History of the Order of Assassins. New York: Funk & Wagnalls. p. 261.
- Hodgson, Marshall G. S. (1955). The Order of the Assassins: The Struggle of theEarly Nizari Isma'ilis against the Islamic World. The Hague, Netherlands: Mouton. p. 352. ISBN 9780404170189.
- Lewis, Bernard (1968). The Assassins: A Radical Sect in Islam. New York: Basic Books. p. 166. ISBN 9780465004980. OCLC 1740057.
- Mirza, Nasseh Ahmed (1997). Syrian Ismailism: The Ever Living Line of theImamite, AD 1100–1260. Richmond, UK: Curzon.
- Reston, James Jr. (2001). Warriors of God: Richard the Lionheart and Saladin in the Third Crusade. New York: Doubleday. ISBN 9780385495615.
- Wasserman, James (1 April 2001). The Templars and the Assassins: The Militia of Heaven. Simon and Schuster. p. 320. ISBN 9781594778735.
- "Rashid al-Din Sinan". www.alamut.com.
