= Khan Jleimdun =

Khan Jleimdun خان جليمدون
- Village
- Location in Syria
- Coordinates: 35.170563°N 36.392212°E
- Country: Syria
- Governorate: Hama
- District: Masyaf District
- Subdistrict: Jubb Ramlah Subdistrict

Population (2004)
  - Total: 69
- Time zone: UTC+3 (AST)
- City Qrya Pcode: C3379

Khan Jleimdun (Arabic: خان جليمدون) is a Syrian village located in Jubb Ramlah Subdistrict in Masyaf District, Hama. According to the Syria Central Bureau of Statistics (CBS), Khan Jleimdun had a population of 69 in the 2004 census.
