= Al-Mashrafah, Hama Governorate =

Al-Mashrafah المشرفة
- Village
- Location in Syria
- Coordinates: 34°58′52″N 36°19′41″E
- Country: Syria
- Governorate: Hama
- District: Masyaf
- Subdistrict: Ayn Halaqim

Population (2004)
  - Total: 1,555
- Time zone: UTC+3 (AST)
- City Qrya Pcode: C3408

Al-Mashrafah (Arabic: المشرفة) is a Syrian village located in Ayn Halaqim Nahiyah in Masyaf District, Hama. According to the Syria Central Bureau of Statistics (CBS), al-Mashrafah had a population of 1,555 in the 2004 census.
