= Al-Zamaliyah =

Al-Zamaliyah الزاملية
- Village
- Location in Syria
- Coordinates: 35°0′21″N 36°24′51″E
- Country: Syria
- Governorate: Hama
- District: Masyaf
- Subdistrict: Masyaf

Population (2004)
  - Total: 877
- Time zone: UTC+3 (AST)
- City Qrya Pcode: C3356

Al-Zamaliyah (Arabic: الزاملية) is a Syrian village located in the Masyaf Subdistrict in Masyaf District, located west of Hama. According to the Syria Central Bureau of Statistics (CBS), al-Zamaliyah had a population of 877 in the 2004 census.
