= Alamiyeh =

Alamiyeh العالمية
- Village
- Location in Syria
- Coordinates: 35.217018°N 36.382491°E
- Country: Syria
- Governorate: Hama
- District: Masyaf District
- Subdistrict: Jubb Ramlah Subdistrict

Population (2004)
  - Total: 301
- Time zone: UTC+3 (AST)
- City Qrya Pcode: C3370

Alamiyeh (Arabic: العالمية) is a Syrian village located in Jubb Ramlah Subdistrict in Masyaf District, Hama. According to the Syria Central Bureau of Statistics (CBS), Alamiyeh had a population of 301 in the 2004 census.
