= Al-Dulaybah =

Al-Dulaybah الدليبة
- Village
- Location in Syria
- Coordinates: 34°56′52″N 36°21′31″E
- Country: Syria
- Governorate: Hama
- District: Masyaf
- Subdistrict: Ayn Halaqim

Population (2004)
  - Total: 1,566
- Time zone: UTC+3 (AST)
- City Qrya Pcode: C3413

Al-Dulaybah (Arabic: الدليبة, also spelled Dleibeh) is a Syrian village located in Ayn Halaqim Nahiyah in Masyaf District, Hama. According to the Syria Central Bureau of Statistics (CBS), al-Dulaybah had a population of 1,566 in the 2004 census.
