= Qossiyeh =

Coordinates: 34.9833°N 36.2500°E

Qossiyeh قصية
- Village
- Location in Syria
- Country: Syria
- Governorate: Hama
- District: Masyaf District
- Subdistrict: Wadi al-Uyun Nahiyah

Population (2004)
  - Total: 645
- Time zone: UTC+3 (AST)
- City Qrya Pcode: C3436

Qossiyeh (Arabic: قصية) is a Syrian village located in Wadi al-Uyun Nahiyah in Masyaf District, Hama. According to the Syria Central Bureau of Statistics (CBS), Qossiyeh had a population of 645 in the 2004 census.
