= Breizeh =

Breizeh بريزة
- Village
- Location in Syria
- Coordinates: 34.979160°N 36.261996°E
- Country: Syria
- Governorate: Hama
- District: Masyaf District
- Subdistrict: Wadi al-Uyun Nahiyah

Population (2004)
  - Total: 196
- Time zone: UTC+3 (AST)
- City Qrya Pcode: C3421

Breizeh (Arabic: بريزة) is a Syrian village located in Wadi al-Uyun Nahiyah in Masyaf District, Hama. According to the Syria Central Bureau of Statistics (CBS), Breizeh had a population of 196 in the 2004 census.
