= Bayt Atiq =

Bayt Atiq بيت عتق Beit el-Atiq
- Village
- Location in Syria
- Coordinates: 34°54′32″N 36°19′12″E
- Country: Syria
- Governorate: Hama
- District: Masyaf
- Subdistrict: Ayn Halaqim

Population (2004)
  - Total: 488
- Time zone: UTC+3 (AST)
- City Qrya Pcode: N/A

Bayt Atiq (Arabic: بيت عتق) is a Syrian village located in the Ayn Halaqim Subdistrict in Masyaf District, located southwest of Hama. According to the Syria Central Bureau of Statistics (CBS), Bayt Atiq had a population of 488 in the 2004 census. In the 1960s, it was described as a small village.

== Bibliography ==
- Boulanger, Robert, ed. (1966). The Middle East, Lebanon, Syria, Jordan, Iraq, Iran. Hachette.
