= Al-Sindiyana, Masyaf =

Al-Sindiyana السنديانة Sindianeh
- Village
- Location in Syria
- Coordinates: 35°0′1″N 36°15′32″E
- Country: Syria
- Governorate: Hama
- District: Masyaf
- Subdistrict: Wadi al-Uyun

Population (2004)
  - Total: 621
- Time zone: UTC+3 (AST)
- City Qrya Pcode: C3432

Al-Sindiyana (Arabic: السنديانة) is a Syrian village located in Wadi al-Uyun Nahiyah in Masyaf District, Hama. According to the Syria Central Bureau of Statistics (CBS), al-Sindiyana had a population of 621 in the 2004 census.
