= Bayt Raqtah =

Village in Syria

Bayt Raqtah (Arabic: بيت رقطة) is a Syrian village located in Wadi al-Uyun Nahiyah in Masyaf District, Hama. According to the Syria Central Bureau of Statistics (CBS), Bayt Raqtah had a population of around 400 in the 2020 census, considering that more than 1,000 of them are outside the village.
