= Deir Huwayt =

Deir Huwayt دير حويت Qasr Deir Huwayt
- Village
- Location in Syria
- Coordinates: 34°59′37″N 36°26′43″E
- Country: Syria
- Governorate: Hama
- District: Masyaf
- Subdistrict: Masyaf

Population (2004)
  - Total: 1,121
- Time zone: UTC+3 (AST)
- City Qrya Pcode: C3362

Deir Huwayt (Arabic: قصر دير حويت, also known as Qasr Deir Huwayt) is a Syrian village located in the Masyaf Subdistrict in Masyaf District, located west of Hama. According to the Syria Central Bureau of Statistics (CBS), Deir Huwayt had a population of 1,121 in the 2004 census. Its inhabitants are predominantly Alawites.

== Bibliography ==
- Robinson, E.; Smith, E. (1841). Biblical Researches in Palestine, Mount Sinai and Arabia Petraea: A Journal of Travels in the year 1838. Vol. 3. Boston: Crocker & Brewster.
