= Uqayrabah =

Uqayrabah عقيربة
- Village
- Location in Syria
- Coordinates: 35°9′44″N 36°27′53″E
- Country: Syria
- Governorate: Hama
- District: Masyaf
- Subdistrict: Jubb Ramlah

Population (2004)
  - Total: 1,515
- Time zone: UTC+3 (AST)
- City Qrya Pcode: C3376

Uqayrabah (Arabic: عقيربة, also spelled Okeirbeh or Iqerba) is a Syrian village located in the Jubb Ramlah Subdistrict of the Masyaf District in Hama Governorate. According to the Syria Central Bureau of Statistics (CBS), Uqayrabah had a population of 1,515 in the 2004 census.
