= Kanfo =

Coordinates: 35.1894°N 36.3903°E

Kanfo كنفو
- Village
- Location in Syria
- Country: Syria
- Governorate: Hama
- District: Masyaf District
- Subdistrict: Jubb Ramlah Subdistrict

Population (2004)
  - Total: 432
- Time zone: UTC+3 (AST)
- City Qrya Pcode: C3382

Kanfo (Arabic: كنفو) is a Syrian village located in Jubb Ramlah Subdistrict in Masyaf District, Hama. According to the Syria Central Bureau of Statistics (CBS), Kanfo had a population of 432 in the 2004 census.
