= Ein El-Bayda =

Ein El-Bayda عين البيضا
- Village
- Location in Syria
- Coordinates: 35°39′N 35°53′E
- Country: Syria
- Governorate: Hama
- District: Masyaf District
- Subdistrict: Wadi al-Uyun Nahiyah

Population (2004)
  - Total: 319
- Time zone: UTC+3 (AST)
- City Qrya Pcode: C3417

Ein El-Bayda (Arabic: عين البيضا) is a Syrian village located in Wadi al-Uyun Nahiyah in Masyaf District, Hama. According to the Syria Central Bureau of Statistics (CBS), Ein El-Bayda had a population of 319 in the 2004 census.
