= Bayt Natar =

Bayt Natar بيت ناطر
- Village
- Location in Syria
- Coordinates: 34°55′1″N 36°21′2″E
- Country: Syria
- Governorate: Hama
- District: Masyaf
- Subdistrict: Ayn Halaqim

Population (2004)
  - Total: 1,304
- Time zone: UTC+3 (AST)
- City Qrya Pcode: C3411

Bayt Natar (Arabic: بيت ناطر, romanized: Bait Nātar) is a Syrian village located in the Ayn Halaqim Subdistrict of the Masyaf District in Hama Governorate. According to the Syria Central Bureau of Statistics (CBS), Bayt Natar had a population of 1,304 in the 2004 census. Its inhabitants are predominantly Turkmens.
