= Dweir Elmashayekh =

Dweir Elmashayekh دوير المشايخ
- Village
- Location in Syria
- Coordinates: 35.000279°N 36.170286°E
- Country: Syria
- Governorate: Hama
- District: Masyaf District
- Subdistrict: Wadi al-Uyun Nahiyah

Population (2004)
  - Total: 692
- Time zone: UTC+3 (AST)
- City Qrya Pcode: C3427

Dweir Elmashayekh (Arabic: دوير المشايخ) is a Syrian village located in Wadi al-Uyun Nahiyah in Masyaf District, Hama. According to the Syria Central Bureau of Statistics (CBS), Dweir Elmashayekh had a population of 692 in the 2004 census.
