= Tin al-Sabil =

Tin al-Sabil تين السبيل
- Village
- Location in Syria
- Coordinates: 34°53′42″N 36°20′28″E
- Country: Syria
- Governorate: Hama
- District: Masyaf
- Subdistrict: Ayn Halaqim

Population (2004)
  - Total: 562
- Time zone: UTC+3 (AST)
- City Qrya Pcode: C3401

Tin al-Sabil (Arabic: تين السبيل) is a Syrian village located in Ayn Halaqim Nahiyah in Masyaf District, Hama. According to the Syria Central Bureau of Statistics (CBS), Tin al-Sabil had a population of 562 in the 2004 census.
