= Al-Majawi =

Al-Majawi المجوي
- Village
- Location in Syria
- Coordinates: 34°59′N 36°20′E
- Country: Syria
- Governorate: Hama
- District: Masyaf
- Subdistrict: Ayn Halaqim

Population (2004)
  - Total: 1,517
- Time zone: UTC+3 (AST)
- City Qrya Pcode: C3410

Al-Majawi (Arabic: المجوي) is a Syrian village located in Ayn Halaqim Nahiyah in Masyaf District, Hama. According to the Syria Central Bureau of Statistics (CBS), al-Majawi had a population of 1,517 in the 2004 census.
