= Kafr Aqid =

Kafr Aqid كفر عقيد
- Village
- Location in Syria
- Coordinates: 35°3′38″N 36°26′31″E
- Country: Syria
- Governorate: Hama
- District: Masyaf
- Subdistrict: Masyaf

Population (2004)
  - Total: 1,373
- Time zone: UTC+3 (AST)
- City Qrya Pcode: C3365

Kafr Aqid (Arabic: كفر عقيد) is a Syrian village located in the Masyaf Subdistrict in Masyaf District, located west of Hama. According to the Syria Central Bureau of Statistics (CBS), Kafr Aqid had a population of 1,373 in the 2004 census.

== History ==
Archaeological finds include a late 2nd- or early 3rd-century hypogeum with remains of frescoes.

According to the Syrian Observatory for Human Rights, on 17 August 2025 members of the General Security Service forcibly displaced the village's residents, not allowing them to take their personal property and money. The General Security Service then told the displaced residents that the village was now theirs, and that the former residents no longer had a right to their homes and land in the village. The homes in the city have since been completely looted and are now occupied by members of the General Security Service.
