= Aq Duqar =

Aq Duqar أق دوكار Aq Duqarah
- Village
- Location in Syria
- Coordinates: 34°58′29″N 36°22′25″E
- Country: Syria
- Governorate: Hama
- District: Masyaf
- Subdistrict: Ayn Halaqim

Population (2004)
  - Total: 377
- Time zone: UTC+3 (AST)
- City Qrya Pcode: C3404

Aq Duqar (Arabic: أق دوكار) is a Syrian village located in Ayn Halaqim Nahiyah in Masyaf District, Hama. According to the Syria Central Bureau of Statistics (CBS), Aq Duqar had a population of 377 in the 2004 census.
