= Hazana =

Hazana الهزانة
- Village
- Location in Syria
- Coordinates: 35°9′25.7826″N 36°25′17.0214″E
- Country: Syria
- Governorate: Hama
- District: Masyaf District
- Subdistrict: Jubb Ramlah Subdistrict

Population (2004)
  - Total: 1,519
- Time zone: UTC+3 (AST)
- City Qrya Pcode: C3369

Hazana (Arabic: الهزانة) is a Syrian village located in Jubb Ramlah Subdistrict in Masyaf District, Hama. According to the Syria Central Bureau of Statistics (CBS), Hazana had a population of 1519 in the 2004 census.
