= Sulukiyeh =

Sulukiyeh سلوكية
- Village
- Location in Syria
- Coordinates: 35.197650°N 36.364081°E
- Country: Syria
- Governorate: Hama
- District: Masyaf District
- Subdistrict: Jubb Ramlah Subdistrict

Population (2004)
  - Total: 773
- Time zone: UTC+3 (AST)
- City Qrya Pcode: C3372

Sulukiyeh (Arabic: سلوكية) is a Syrian village located in Jubb Ramlah Subdistrict in Masyaf District, Hama. According to the Syria Central Bureau of Statistics (CBS), Sulukiyeh had a population of 773 in the 2004 census.
