= Al-Findara =

Al-Findara الفندارة
- Village
- Location in Syria
- Coordinates: 35°1′24″N 36°19′51″E
- Country: Syria
- Governorate: Hama
- District: Masyaf
- Subdistrict: Masyaf

Population (2004)
  - Total: 1,594
- Time zone: UTC+3 (AST)
- City Qrya Pcode: C3363

Al-Findara (Arabic: الفندارة) is a Syrian village located in the Masyaf Subdistrict in Masyaf District, west of Hama. According to the Syria Central Bureau of Statistics (CBS), Al-Findara had a population of 1,594 in the 2004 census. Its inhabitants are predominantly Alawites. On 7 March 2025, five civilians in the village were executed by Syrian security forces during the March clashes.
