= Mashta Deir Mama =

Mashta Deir Mama مشتى دير ماما
- Village
- Location in Syria
- Coordinates: 35.141354°N 36.370342°E
- Country: Syria
- Governorate: Hama
- District: Masyaf District
- Subdistrict: Masyaf Nahiyah

Population (2004)
  - Total: 169
- Time zone: UTC+3 (AST)
- City Qrya Pcode: C3364

Mashta Deir Mama (Arabic: مشتى دير ماما) is a Syrian village located in Masyaf Nahiyah in Masyaf District, Hama. According to the Syria Central Bureau of Statistics (CBS), Mashta Deir Mama had a population of 169 in the 2004 census.
