= Jbita, Hama =

Jbita, Hama جبيتا
- Village
- Location in Syria
- Coordinates: 35.017415°N 36.207826°E
- Country: Syria
- Governorate: Hama
- District: Masyaf District
- Subdistrict: Wadi al-Uyun Nahiyah

Population (2004)
  - Total: 687
- Time zone: UTC+3 (AST)
- City Qrya Pcode: C3429

Jbita (Arabic: جبيتا) is a Syrian village located in Wadi al-Uyun Nahiyah in Masyaf District, Hama. According to the Syria Central Bureau of Statistics (CBS), Jbita, Hama had a population of 687 in the 2004 census.
