= Sarmiyeh =

Coordinates: 35.2353°N 36.3831°E

Sarmiyeh الصارمية
- Village
- Location in Syria
- Country: Syria
- Governorate: Hama
- District: Masyaf District
- Subdistrict: Jubb Ramlah Subdistrict

Population (2004)
  - Total: 2,953
- Time zone: UTC+3 (AST)
- City Qrya Pcode: C3381

Sarmiyeh (Arabic: الصارمية) is a Syrian village located in Jubb Ramlah Subdistrict in Masyaf District, Hama. According to the Syria Central Bureau of Statistics (CBS), Sarmiyeh had a population of 2,953 in the 2004 census.
