= Hermel, Syria =

Hermel حرمل Harmil
- Village
- Location in Syria
- Coordinates: 34°54′21″N 36°21′5″E
- Country: Syria
- Governorate: Hama
- District: Masyaf
- Subdistrict: Ayn Halaqim

Population (2004)
  - Total: 871
- Time zone: UTC+3 (AST)
- City Qrya Pcode: C3412

Hermel (Arabic: حرمل; also spelled Harmil) is a Syrian village located in the Ayn Halaqim Subdistrict of the Masyaf District in Hama Governorate. According to the Syria Central Bureau of Statistics (CBS), Hermel had a population of 871 in the 2004 census. Its inhabitants are predominantly Turkmens.
