= Asheq Omar =

′Asheq Omar عاشق عمر ′Ashiq Umar
- Village
- Location in Syria
- Coordinates: 34°57′12″N 36°19′27″E
- Country: Syria
- Governorate: Hama
- District: Masyaf
- Subdistrict: Ayn Halaqim

Population (2004)
  - Total: 473
- Time zone: UTC+3 (AST)
- City Qrya Pcode: C3402

′Asheq Omar (Arabic: عاشق عمر, also spelled ′Ashiq Umar) is a Syrian village located in Ayn Halaqim Nahiyah in Masyaf District, Hama. According to the Syria Central Bureau of Statistics (CBS), ′Asheq Omar had a population of 473 in the 2004 census.
