= Zawi, Hama =

Zawi, Hama الزاوي
- Village
- Location in Syria
- Coordinates: 35.165423°N 36.340091°E
- Country: Syria
- Governorate: Hama
- District: Masyaf District
- Subdistrict: Jubb Ramlah Subdistrict

Population (2004)
  - Total: 1,744
- Time zone: UTC+3 (AST)
- City Qrya Pcode: C3377

Zawi, Hama (Arabic: الزاوي) is a Syrian village located in Jubb Ramlah Subdistrict in Masyaf District, Hama. According to the Syria Central Bureau of Statistics (CBS), Zawi, Hama had a population of 1,744 in the 2004 census.
