= Biqasqas =

Biqasqas بقصقص Qusqus
- Village
- Location in Syria
- Coordinates: 35°3′55″N 36°29′28″E
- Country: Syria
- Governorate: Hama
- District: Masyaf
- Subdistrict: Masyaf

Population (2004)
  - Total: 514
- Time zone: UTC+3 (AST)
- City Qrya Pcode: C3358

Biqasqas (Arabic: بقصقص, also known as Qusqus) is a Syrian village located in the Masyaf Subdistrict in Masyaf District, located west of Hama. According to the Syria Central Bureau of Statistics (CBS), Biqasqas had a population of 514 in the 2004 census.
