= Qurtuman =

Qurtuman قرطمان
- Village
- Location in Syria
- Coordinates: 34°58′27″N 36°24′12″E
- Country: Syria
- Governorate: Hama
- District: Masyaf
- Subdistrict: Masyaf

Population (2004)
  - Total: 1,467
- Time zone: UTC+3 (AST)
- City Qrya Pcode: C3366

Qurtuman (Arabic: قرطمان, romanized: Kūrtūmān) is a Syrian village located in the Masyaf Subdistrict in Masyaf District, located west of Hama. According to the Syria Central Bureau of Statistics (CBS), Qurtuman had a population of 1,467 in the 2004 census. Its inhabitants are predominantly Alawites.

== Bibliography ==
- Robinson, E.; Smith, E. (1841). Biblical Researches in Palestine, Mount Sinai and Arabia Petraea: A Journal of Travels in the year 1838. Vol. 3. Boston: Crocker & Brewster.
