= Matnah, Syria =

Matna, Hama متنا
- Village
- Location in Syria
- Coordinates: 34°58′15″N 36°24′01″E
- Country: Syria
- Governorate: Hama
- District: Masyaf District
- Subdistrict: Masyaf Nahiyah

Population (2004)
  - Total: 489
- Time zone: UTC+3 (AST)
- City Qrya Pcode: N/A

Matna, Hama (Arabic: متنا) is a Syrian village located in Masyaf Nahiyah in Masyaf District, Hama. According to the Syria Central Bureau of Statistics (CBS), Matna, Hama had a population of 489 in the 2004 census.
