= Qasr al-Ayan =

Elayan Castle قلعة عليان
- Village
- Location in Syria
- Coordinates: 34.921889°N 36.330106°E
- Country: Syria
- Governorate: Hama
- District: Masyaf District
- Subdistrict: Ayn Halaqim Nahiyah

Population (2004)
  - Total: 257
- Time zone: UTC+3 (AST)
- City Qrya Pcode: C3416

Elayan Castle (Arabic: قلعة عليان) is a Syrian village located in Ayn Halaqim Nahiyah in Masyaf District, Hama. According to the Syria Central Bureau of Statistics (CBS), Elayan Castle had a population of 257 in the 2004 census.
