= Qurayyat, Hama =

Qurayyat القريات Qrayat
- Village
- Location in Syria
- Coordinates: 35.1764°N 36.3328°E
- Country: Syria
- Governorate: Hama
- District: Masyaf District
- Subdistrict: Jubb Ramlah Subdistrict

Population (2004)
  - Total: 943
- Time zone: UTC+3 (AST)
- City Qrya Pcode: C3378

Qurayyat (Arabic: القريات, also spelled Qrayat) is a Syrian village located in Jubb Ramlah Subdistrict in Masyaf District, Hama. According to the Syria Central Bureau of Statistics (CBS), Qurayyat had a population of 943 in the 2004 census. Its inhabitants are predominantly Alawites.

== Bibliography ==
- Boulanger, Robert (1966). The Middle East, Lebanon, Syria, Jordan, Iraq, Iran. Hachette.
