= Qabu Shamsiyah =

Qabu Shamsiyeh قبو شمسية
- Village
- Location in Syria
- Coordinates: 34.994829°N 36.332195°E
- Country: Syria
- Governorate: Hama
- District: Masyaf District
- Subdistrict: Masyaf Nahiyah

Population (2004)
  - Total: 345
- Time zone: UTC+3 (AST)
- City Qrya Pcode: C3361

Qabu Shamsiyeh (Arabic: قبو شمسية) is a Syrian village located in Masyaf Nahiyah in Masyaf District, Hama. According to the Syria Central Bureau of Statistics (CBS), Qabu Shamsiyeh had a population of 345 in the 2004 census.
