= Bit Elwadi =

Bit Elwadi بيت الوادي
- Village
- Location in Syria
- Coordinates: 34.986459°N 36.232696°E
- Country: Syria
- Governorate: Hama
- District: Masyaf District
- Subdistrict: Wadi al-Uyun Nahiyah

Population (2004)
  - Total: 157
- Time zone: UTC+3 (AST)
- City Qrya Pcode: N/A

Bit Elwadi (Arabic: بيت الوادي) is a Syrian village located in Wadi al-Uyun Nahiyah in Masyaf District, Hama. According to the Syria Central Bureau of Statistics (CBS), Bit Elwadi had a population of 157 in the 2004 census.
