= Kameliyeh =

Kameliyeh الكاملية
- Village
- Location in Syria
- Coordinates: 35.009067°N 36.204843°E
- Country: Syria
- Governorate: Hama
- District: Masyaf District
- Subdistrict: Wadi al-Uyun Nahiyah

Population (2004)
  - Total: 532
- Time zone: UTC+3 (AST)
- City Qrya Pcode: C3425

Kameliyeh (Arabic: الكاملية) is a Syrian village located in Wadi al-Uyun Nahiyah in Masyaf District, Hama. According to the Syria Central Bureau of Statistics (CBS), Kameliyeh had a population of 532 in the 2004 census.
