= Al-Haylunah =

Al-Haylunah الحيلونة
- Village
- Location in Syria
- Coordinates: 35°7′55″N 36°17′7″E
- Country: Syria
- Governorate: Hama
- District: Masyaf
- Subdistrict: Masyaf

Population (2004)
  - Total: 1,665
- Time zone: UTC+3 (AST)
- City Qrya Pcode: C3335

Al-Haylunah (Arabic: الحيلونة) is a Syrian village located in the Masyaf Subdistrict in Masyaf District, located west of Hama. According to the Syria Central Bureau of Statistics (CBS), al-Haylunah had a population of 1,665 in the 2004 census.
