= Jreijes =

Jreijes جريجس
- Village
- Location in Syria
- Coordinates: 35.196624°N 36.502955°E
- Country: Syria
- Governorate: Hama
- District: Masyaf District
- Subdistrict: Jubb Ramlah Subdistrict

Population (2004)
  - Total: 1,567
- Time zone: UTC+3 (AST)
- City Qrya Pcode: C3452

Jreijes (Arabic: جريجس) is a Syrian village located in Jubb Ramlah Subdistrict in Masyaf District, Hama. According to the Syria Central Bureau of Statistics (CBS), Jreijes had a population of 1,567 in the 2004 census. The village is inhabited by Sunni Kurds.
