= Tamarqiyeh =

Tamarqiyeh الطمارقية
- Village
- Location in Syria
- Coordinates: 34.980710°N 36.224735°E
- Country: Syria
- Governorate: Hama
- District: Masyaf District
- Subdistrict: Wadi al-Uyun Nahiyah

Population (2004)
  - Total: 607
- Time zone: UTC+3 (AST)
- City Qrya Pcode: C3420

Tamarqiyeh (Arabic: الطمارقية) is a Syrian village located in Wadi al-Uyun Nahiyah in Masyaf District, Hama. According to the Syria Central Bureau of Statistics (CBS), Tamarqiyeh had a population of 607 in the 2004 census.
