= Al-Shamsiyah =

Al-Shamsiyah الشمسية Al-Shumaysah
- Village
- Location in Syria
- Coordinates: 34°59′28″N 36°19′42″E
- Country: Syria
- Governorate: Hama
- District: Masyaf
- Subdistrict: Masyaf

Population (2004)
  - Total: 1,452
- Time zone: UTC+3 (AST)
- City Qrya Pcode: N/A

Al-Shamsiyah (Arabic: الشمسية) is a Syrian village located in the Masyaf Subdistrict in Masyaf District, located west of Hama. According to the Syria Central Bureau of Statistics (CBS), al-Shamsiyah had a population of 1,452 in the 2004 census.
