= Jelmidon =

Jelmidon جلميدون
- Village
- Location in Syria
- Coordinates: 35.162635°N 36.389937°E
- Country: Syria
- Governorate: Hama
- District: Masyaf District
- Subdistrict: Jubb Ramlah Subdistrict

Population (2004)
  - Total: 991
- Time zone: UTC+3 (AST)
- City Qrya Pcode: N/A

Jelmidon (Arabic: جلميدون) is a Syrian village located in Jubb Ramlah Subdistrict in Masyaf District, Hama. According to the Syria Central Bureau of Statistics (CBS), Jelmidon had a population of 991 in the 2004 census.
