= Ein Elkaram =

Ein Elkaram عين الكرم
- Village
- Location in Syria
- Coordinates: 35.017076°N 36.221892°E
- Country: Syria
- Governorate: Hama
- District: Masyaf District
- Subdistrict: Wadi al-Uyun Nahiyah

Population (2004)
  - Total: 564
- Time zone: UTC+3 (AST)
- City Qrya Pcode: C3424

Ein Elkaram (Arabic: عين الكرم) is a Syrian village located in Wadi al-Uyun Nahiyah in Masyaf District, Hama. According to the Syria Central Bureau of Statistics (CBS), Ein Elkaram had a population of 564 in the 2004 census.
