= Sighata =

Sighata سيغاتا
- Village
- Location in Syria
- Coordinates: 35°1′29″N 36°26′40″E
- Country: Syria
- Governorate: Hama
- District: Masyaf
- Subdistrict: Masyaf

Population (2004)
  - Total: 1,739
- Time zone: UTC+3 (AST)
- City Qrya Pcode: C3347

Sighata (Arabic: سيغاتا) is a Syrian village located in the Masyaf Subdistrict in Masyaf District, located west of Hama. According to the Syria Central Bureau of Statistics (CBS), Sighata had a population of 1,739 in the 2004 census. Its inhabitants are predominantly Alawites.

== Bibliography ==
- Robinson, E.; Smith, E. (1841). Biblical Researches in Palestine, Mount Sinai and Arabia Petraea: A Journal of Travels in the year 1838. Vol. 3. Boston: Crocker & Brewster.
