= Hikr Bayt Atiq =

Hikr Beit Atiq حكر بيت عتق
- Village
- Location in Syria
- Coordinates: 34°54′27″N 36°19′29″E
- Country: Syria
- Governorate: Hama
- District: Masyaf
- Subdistrict: Ayn Halaqim

Population (2004)
  - Total: 336
- Time zone: UTC+3 (AST)
- City Qrya Pcode: C3414

Hikr Bayt Atiq (Arabic: حكر بيت عتق) is a Syrian village located in Ayn Halaqim Nahiyah in Masyaf District, Hama. According to the Syria Central Bureau of Statistics (CBS), Hikr Bayt Atiq had a population of 336 in the 2004 census.
