= Tayr Jubbah =

Tayr Jubbah طير جبة
- Village
- Location in Syria
- Coordinates: 35°10′18″N 36°18′27″E
- Country: Syria
- Governorate: Hama
- District: Masyaf
- Subdistrict: Masyaf

Population (2004)
  - Total: 1,027
- Time zone: UTC+3 (AST)
- City Qrya Pcode: C3342

Tayr Jubbah (Arabic: طير جبة) is a Syrian village located in the Masyaf Subdistrict in Masyaf District, located west of Hama. According to the Syria Central Bureau of Statistics (CBS), Tayr Jubbah had a population of 1,027 in the 2004 census.
