= Kahf al-Habash =

Kahf al-Habash كهف الحبش
- Village
- Location in Syria
- Coordinates: 34°58′14″N 36°19′19″E
- Country: Syria
- Governorate: Hama
- District: Masyaf
- Subdistrict: Ayn Halaqim

Population (2004)
  - Total: 508
- Time zone: UTC+3 (AST)
- City Qrya Pcode: C3415

Kahf al-Habash (Arabic: كهف الحبش) is a Syrian village located in Ayn Halaqim Nahiyah in Masyaf District, Hama. According to the Syria Central Bureau of Statistics (CBS), Kahf al-Habash had a population of 508 in the 2004 census.
