= Mushashin =

Mushashin موشاشين
- Village
- Location in Syria
- Coordinates: 35.204733°N 36.360680°E
- Country: Syria
- Governorate: Hama
- District: Masyaf District
- Subdistrict: Jubb Ramlah Subdistrict

Population (2004)
  - Total: 605
- Time zone: UTC+3 (AST)
- City Qrya Pcode: C3383

Mushashin (Arabic: موشاشين) is a Syrian village located in Jubb Ramlah Subdistrict in Masyaf District, Hama. According to the Syria Central Bureau of Statistics (CBS), Mushashin had a population of 605 in the 2004 census. By 13 February 2025, it had a population of 740.
