= Ameriyeh, Hama =

Ameriyeh, Hama العامرية
- Village
- Location in Syria
- Coordinates: 35.007380°N 36.230614°E
- Country: Syria
- Governorate: Hama
- District: Masyaf District
- Subdistrict: Wadi al-Uyun Nahiyah

Population (2004)
  - Total: 402
- Time zone: UTC+3 (AST)
- City Qrya Pcode: C3428

Ameriyeh, Hama (Arabic: العامرية) is a Syrian village located in Wadi al-Uyun Nahiyah in Masyaf District, Hama. According to the Syria Central Bureau of Statistics (CBS), Ameriyeh, Hama had a population of 402 in the 2004 census.
