= Jobet Kalakh =

Jobet Kalakh جوبة كلخ
- Village
- Location in Syria
- Coordinates: 35.138873°N 36.362098°E
- Country: Syria
- Governorate: Hama
- District: Masyaf District
- Subdistrict: Masyaf Nahiyah

Population (2004)
  - Total: 103
- Time zone: UTC+3 (AST)
- City Qrya Pcode: C3344

Jobet Kalakh (Arabic: جوبة كلخ) is a Syrian village located in Masyaf Nahiyah in Masyaf District, Hama. According to the Syria Central Bureau of Statistics (CBS), Jobet Kalakh had a population of 103 in the 2004 census.
