= Baamrah =

Ba'amrah بعمرة
- Village
- Location in Syria
- Coordinates: 34°57′7″N 36°20′58″E
- Country: Syria
- Governorate: Hama
- District: Masyaf
- Subdistrict: Ayn Halaqim

Population (2004)
  - Total: 508
- Time zone: UTC+3 (AST)
- City Qrya Pcode: C3406

Ba'amrah (Arabic: بعمرة, also spelled Ba'amra) is a Syrian village located in the Ayn Halaqim Subdistrict of the Masyaf District in Hama Governorate. According to the Syria Central Bureau of Statistics (CBS), Ba'amrah had a population of 508 in the 2004 census. Its inhabitants are predominantly Alawites.

== History ==
In the early 1930s, during French rule, the owner of Baamrah, Shaykh Sulayman al-Ali of the Alawite Matawirah confederation, went bankrupt and Baamrah was purchased by an Ismaili businessman from Masyaf named Muhammad Ibrahim. The inhabitants of Baamrah protested the sale of their village and vacated the area to deprive Ibrahim of revenues in 1935. In response, Ibrahim attempted to resettle the village by giving land in Baamrah to 30 Ismaili families from Salamiyah. Upon their arrival to the village, the Ismailis of Salamiyah were assaulted and forced out of the area by Baamrah's former inhabitants. One Ismaili was killed and four injured. The village was resettled by its former inhabitants, but tensions between local Alawite and Ismaili communities remained tense for several years following the incident.
