= Anbura =

Anbura عنبورة
- Village
- Location in Syria
- Coordinates: 35°7′17″N 36°20′27″E
- Country: Syria
- Governorate: Hama
- District: Masyaf
- Subdistrict: Masyaf

Population (2004)
  - Total: 998
- Time zone: UTC+3 (AST)
- City Qrya Pcode: C3350

Anbura (Arabic: عنبورة) is a Syrian village located in the Masyaf Subdistrict in Masyaf District, located west of Hama. According to the Syria Central Bureau of Statistics (CBS), Anbura had a population of 998 in the 2004 census. Its inhabitants are predominantly Alawites.

As of March 2025, the village of Anbura had a population of 1,481.

== Bibliography ==
- Boulanger, Robert (1966). The Middle East, Lebanon, Syria, Jordan, Iraq, Iran. Hachette.
