= Naqir =

Naqir نقير
- Village
- Location in Syria
- Coordinates: 34.996157°N 36.220744°E
- Country: Syria
- Governorate: Hama
- District: Masyaf District
- Subdistrict: Wadi al-Uyun Nahiyah

Population (2004)
  - Total: 389
- Time zone: UTC+3 (AST)
- City Qrya Pcode: C3437

Naqir (Arabic: نقير) is a Syrian village located in Wadi al-Uyun Nahiyah in Masyaf District, Hama. According to the Syria Central Bureau of Statistics (CBS), Naqir had a population of 389 in the 2004 census.
