= Tell Afar =

Tell Afar could refer to the following places in the Middle East:

- Tal Afar, a major city in northern Iraq
- Tell Afar, Syria, a village in northern Syria
