= Tell Afar, Syria =

Tell 'Afar تل أعفر
- Village
- Location in Syria
- Coordinates: 35°6′19″N 36°30′30″E
- Country: Syria
- Governorate: Hama
- District: Masyaf
- Subdistrict: Masyaf

Population (2004)
  - Total: 610
- Time zone: UTC+3 (AST)
- City Qrya Pcode: C3338

Tell Afar (Arabic: تل أعفر) is a Syrian village located in the Masyaf Subdistrict in Masyaf District, located west of Hama. According to the Syria Central Bureau of Statistics (CBS), Tell Afar had a population of 610 in the 2004 census.
