= Bashawi =

Bashawi بشاوي
- Village
- Location in Syria
- Coordinates: 34.983435°N 36.210229°E
- Country: Syria
- Governorate: Hama
- District: Masyaf District
- Subdistrict: Wadi al-Uyun Nahiyah

Population (2004)
  - Total: 253
- Time zone: UTC+3 (AST)
- City Qrya Pcode: C3419

Bashawi (Arabic: بشاوي) is a Syrian village located in Wadi al-Uyun Nahiyah in Masyaf District, Hama. According to the Syria Central Bureau of Statistics (CBS), Bashawi had a population of 253 in the 2004 census.
