= Kafr Laha, Hama =

Kafr Laha, Hama كفر لاها
- Village
- Location in Syria
- Coordinates: 34.976760°N 36.146479°E
- Country: Syria
- Governorate: Hama
- District: Masyaf
- Subdistrict: Wadhi al-Uyun

Population (2004)
  - Total: 379
- Time zone: UTC+3 (AST)
- City Qrya Pcode: C3435

Kafr Laha, Hama (Arabic: كفر لاها) is a Syrian village located in Wadi al-Uyun Nahiyah in Masyaf District, Hama. According to the Syria Central Bureau of Statistics (CBS), Kafr Laha, Hama had a population of 379 in the 2004 census.

== History ==
In 1838, Kafr Laha's inhabitants were noted to be predominantly Sunni Muslims.

== Bibliography ==
- Robinson, E.; Smith, E. (1841). Biblical Researches in Palestine, Mount Sinai and Arabia Petraea: A Journal of Travels in the year 1838. Vol. 3. Boston: Crocker & Brewster.
