= Marha, Hama =

Marha, Hama المرحة
- Village
- Location in Syria
- Coordinates: 34.977429°N 36.245034°E
- Country: Syria
- Governorate: Hama
- District: Masyaf District
- Subdistrict: Wadi al-Uyun Nahiyah

Population (2004)
  - Total: 378
- Time zone: UTC+3 (AST)
- City Qrya Pcode: C3418

Marha, Hama (Arabic: المرحة) is a Syrian village located in Wadi al-Uyun Nahiyah in Masyaf District, Hama. According to the Syria Central Bureau of Statistics (CBS), Marha, Hama had a population of 378 in the 2004 census.
