= Zaytuneh =

Zaytuneh الزيتونة
- Village
- Location in Syria
- Coordinates: 35.016110°N 36.217339°E
- Country: Syria
- Governorate: Hama
- District: Masyaf District
- Subdistrict: Wadi al-Uyun Nahiyah

Population (2004)
  - Total: 304
- Time zone: UTC+3 (AST)
- City Qrya Pcode: C3426

Zaytuneh (Arabic: الزيتونة) is a Syrian village located in Wadi al-Uyun Nahiyah in Masyaf District, Hama. According to the Syria Central Bureau of Statistics (CBS), Zaytuneh had a population of 304 according to the 2004 census.
