= Ain Halaqim Subdistrict =

Ayn Halaqim Subdistrict ناحية عين حلاقيم
- Subdistrict (nahiyah)
- Location in Hama Governorate

- Location in Syria
- Coordinates: 34°55′42″N 36°19′40″E
- Country: Syria
- Governorate: Hama
- District: Masyaf District
- Capital: Ayn Halaqim

Population (2004)
  - Total: 16,502
- Time zone: UTC+2 (EET)
  - Summer (DST): UTC+3 (EEST)
- Nahya pcod: SY050403

Ayn Halaqim Subdistrict (Arabic: ناحية عين حلاقيم) is a Syrian nahiyah (subdistrict) located in Masyaf District in Hama. According to the Syria Central Bureau of Statistics (CBS), Ayn Halaqim Subdistrict had a population of 16,502 in the 2004 census. As of July 2023, the sub-district had a population of 21,517.
