= Wadi al-Uyun Subdistrict =

Wadi al-Uyun Subdistrict ناحية وادي العيون
- Subdistrict (nahiyah)
- Location in Hama Governorate

- Location in Syria
- Country: Syria
- Governorate: Hama
- District: Masyaf District

Population (2004)
  - Total: 12,951
- Time zone: UTC+2 (EET)
  - Summer (DST): UTC+3 (EEST)
- Nahya pcod: SY050404

Wadi al-Uyun Subdistrict (Arabic: ناحية وادي العيون) is a Syrian nahiyah (subdistrict) located in Masyaf District in Hama. According to the Syria Central Bureau of Statistics (CBS), Wadi al-Uyun Subdistrict had a population of 12,951 in the 2004 census. As of July 2023, the population had increased to 26,955, of whom 6,946 (25.77%) were IDPs.

== Localities of the subdistrict ==
The following villages make up Wadi al-'Uyun Subdistrict.

- Wadi al-Uyun 3,371 (Arabic: وادي العيون)
- Birat al-Jurd 1,670 (Arabic: بيرة الجرد)
- Qussiyah 645 (Arabic: قصية)
- Jabita 687 (Arabic: جبيتا)
- Tamarqiyah 607 (Arabic: الطمارقية)
- Duwayr al-Mashayekh 692 (Arabic: دوير المشايخ)
- Sindiyana 621 (Arabic: السنديانة)
- Bayt Raqata 265 (Arabic: بيت رقطة)
- Ammuriyah 402 (Arabic: العامرية)
- Ayn al-Karam 564 (Arabic: عين الكرم)
- Kamaliyah 532 (Arabic: الكاملية)
- Kafr Laha, Hama 379 (Arabic: كفر لاها)
- Ayn Farraj 190 (Arabic: عين فراج)
- Bashawi 253 (Arabic: بشاوي)
- Braize 196 (Arabic: بريزة)
- Bayt al-Wadi 157 (Arabic: بيت الوادي)
- Ayn al-Bayda 319 (Arabic: عين البيضا)
- Zaytuneh 304 (Arabic: الزيتونة)
- Maysara 330 (Arabic: المعيصرة)
- Naqir 389 (Arabic: نقير)
- Marha 378 (Arabic: المرحة)
