= Jubb Ramlah Subdistrict =

Jubb Ramlah Subdistrict ناحية جب رملة
- Subdistrict (nahiyah)
- Location in Hama Governorate

- Location in Syria
- Country: Syria
- Governorate: Hama
- District: Masyaf District
- Capital: Jubb Ramlah

Population (2004)
  - Total: 39,814
- Time zone: UTC+2 (EET)
  - Summer (DST): UTC+3 (EEST)
- Nahya pcod: SY050401

Jubb Ramlah Subdistrict (Arabic: ناحية جب رملة) is a Syrian nahiyah (subdistrict) located in Masyaf District in Hama. According to the Syria Central Bureau of Statistics (CBS), Jubb Ramlah Subdistrict had a population of 39,814 in the 2004 census. As of July 2023, the population was estimated to be 40,076.
