= Masyaf Subdistrict =

Masyaf Subdistrict ناحية مركز مصياف
- Subdistrict (nahiyah)
- Location in Hama Governorate

- Location in Syria
- Country: Syria
- Governorate: Hama
- District: Masyaf District
- Capital: Masyaf

Population (2004)
  - Total: 68,184
- Time zone: UTC+2 (EET)
  - Summer (DST): UTC+3 (EEST)
- Nahya pcod: SY050400

Masyaf Subdistrict (Arabic: ناحية مركز مصياف) is a Syrian nahiyah (subdistrict) located in Masyaf District in Hama. According to the Syria Central Bureau of Statistics (CBS), Masyaf Subdistrict had a population of 68,184 in the 2004 census. As of July 2023, the population was estimated to be 67,185.
