= Masyaf District =

District of Hama, Syria

Masyaf District مصياف
- District
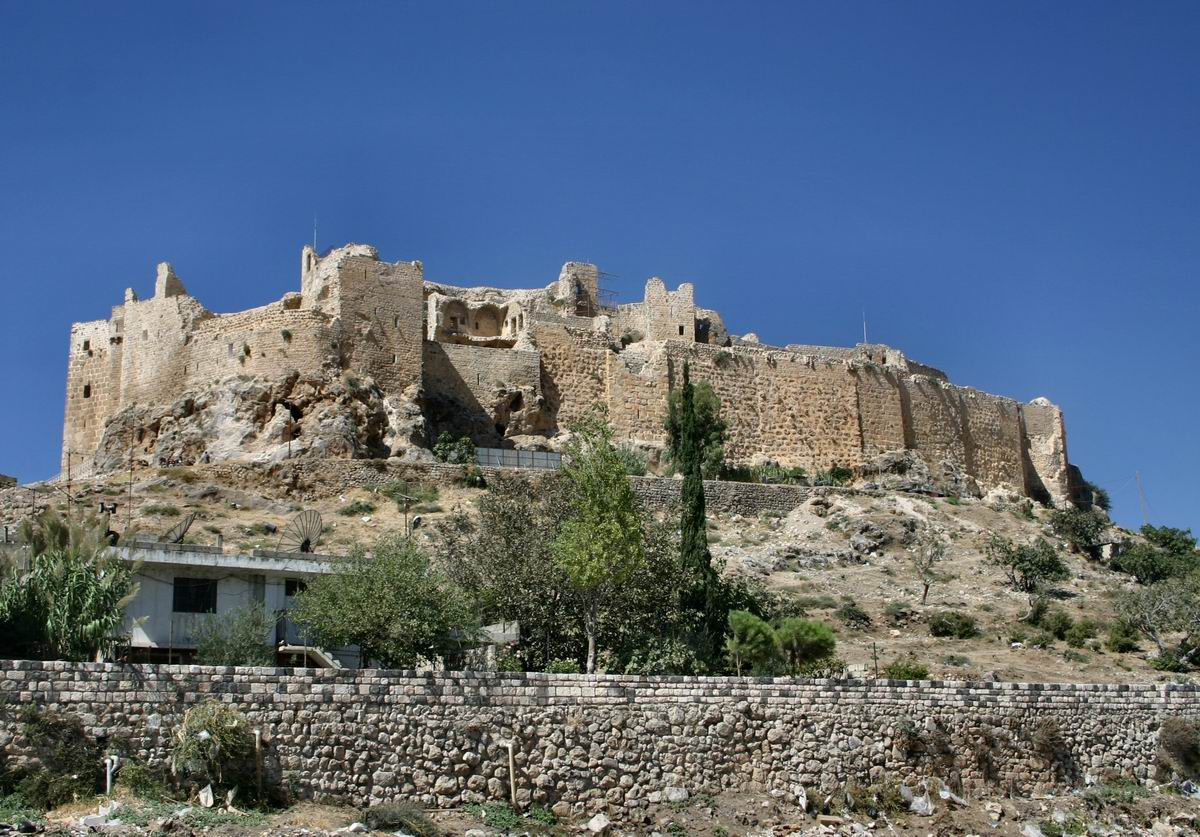
- Fort of Masyaf

- Map of Masyaf District within Hama Governorate
- Coordinates (Masyaf): 35.0653°N 36.3422°E
- Country: Syria
- Governorate: Hama
- Seat: Masyaf
- Subdistricts: 5 nawāḥī

Population (2004)
  - Total: 170,795

Masyaf District (Arabic: مصياف Maṣyāf) is a district (manṭiqat) of the Homs Governorate, Syria. According to the 2004 Census it had a population of 170,795. The district is divided into five sub-districts (nawāḥī).

== History ==
The town of Masyaf served as the administrative center of the Nizari Ismaili state in Syria during the 12th century. In 1260, Masyaf was among four Nizari fortresses captured by the Mongols. The surviving structures in the fort was constructed by the Ismailis in the 12th and 13th centuries over an existing structure from the Byzantine period located on a rocky outcrop overlooking the settlement. The Mamluks took the fortresses later that year after defeating the Mongols in the Battle of Ain Jalut. In 1270, Sultan Baybars brought Masyaf under his authority. The Ismailis remained in control of Maysaf under Mamluk supervision. Later, it came under the Ottoman Empire.

During the Syrian civil war, the Israeli armed forces have repeatedly targeted a research and missile production facility in the district. After initial attacks in 2020, it was raided in September 2024 by ground forces while being covered by air attack from the Israeli Air Force. The Syrian state media reported 16 deaths and 36 injuries apart from damage to infrastructure during the attack.

== Geography ==
Masyaf District is one of the six administrative districts (manṭiqat) of Hama Governorate, Syria. The city of Masyaf, the capital of the district, is located approximately 40 km (25 mi) west of Hama. The district is divided into five sub-districts (nawāḥī)–Masyaf (مصياف), Jubb Ramlah (جب رملة), Awj (عوج), Ayn Halaqim (عين حلاقيم), Wadi al-Uyun (وادي العيون).

== Demographics ==
According to the 2004 census, the district had a population of 170,795, comprising 86,975 males and 83,820 females. The census recorded 32,157 households, with an average household size of 5.3 people. The illiteracy rate was 7.4% among males and 22.8% among females. About 70.5% of the population were recorded as engaged in paid work, 15.1% were self-employed and 9.9% worked without pay. The unemployment rate among males was 17.7%. Approximately 91.7% of the households were own houses.

The 2004 census recorded 68,184 inhabitants in Masyaf sub-district, 39,814 in Jubb Ramlah, 33,344 in Awj, 16,502 in Ayn Halaqim and 12,951 in Wadi al-Uyun. According to the United Nations Office for the Coordination of Humanitarian Affairs (OCHA), the population was estimated in 2021 as 66,423 in Masyaf sub-district, 40,023 in Jubb Ramlah, 47,456 in Awj, 21,492 in Ayn Halaqim, and 26,986 in Wadi al-Uyun. According to OCHA's 2024 report, Masyaf sub-district had an estimated population of 67,185, Oj had 47,573, Jeb Ramleh had 40,076, Wadi al-Uyun had 26,955 and Ayn Halaqim had 21,517. The combined estimated population of the district was 203,306, including 16,699 internally displaced people.
